

447001–447100 

|-bgcolor=#fefefe
| 447001 ||  || — || January 21, 2004 || Cerro Paranal || Paranal Obs. || — || align=right data-sort-value="0.52" | 520 m || 
|-id=002 bgcolor=#E9E9E9
| 447002 ||  || — || February 11, 2004 || Palomar || NEAT || — || align=right data-sort-value="0.98" | 980 m || 
|-id=003 bgcolor=#E9E9E9
| 447003 ||  || — || January 19, 2004 || Kitt Peak || Spacewatch || — || align=right | 1.6 km || 
|-id=004 bgcolor=#fefefe
| 447004 ||  || — || February 16, 2004 || Kitt Peak || Spacewatch || — || align=right data-sort-value="0.78" | 780 m || 
|-id=005 bgcolor=#E9E9E9
| 447005 ||  || — || March 15, 2004 || Catalina || CSS || — || align=right | 1.5 km || 
|-id=006 bgcolor=#E9E9E9
| 447006 ||  || — || February 26, 2004 || Socorro || LINEAR || JUN || align=right | 1.1 km || 
|-id=007 bgcolor=#fefefe
| 447007 ||  || — || March 15, 2004 || Catalina || CSS || — || align=right data-sort-value="0.90" | 900 m || 
|-id=008 bgcolor=#E9E9E9
| 447008 ||  || — || March 15, 2004 || Kitt Peak || Spacewatch || — || align=right | 2.9 km || 
|-id=009 bgcolor=#E9E9E9
| 447009 ||  || — || March 16, 2004 || Catalina || CSS || — || align=right | 1.9 km || 
|-id=010 bgcolor=#E9E9E9
| 447010 ||  || — || March 18, 2004 || Socorro || LINEAR || — || align=right | 1.7 km || 
|-id=011 bgcolor=#fefefe
| 447011 ||  || — || March 19, 2004 || Socorro || LINEAR || H || align=right data-sort-value="0.62" | 620 m || 
|-id=012 bgcolor=#fefefe
| 447012 ||  || — || March 18, 2004 || Socorro || LINEAR || — || align=right data-sort-value="0.76" | 760 m || 
|-id=013 bgcolor=#fefefe
| 447013 ||  || — || March 27, 2004 || Anderson Mesa || LONEOS || H || align=right data-sort-value="0.72" | 720 m || 
|-id=014 bgcolor=#E9E9E9
| 447014 ||  || — || April 9, 2004 || Siding Spring || SSS || — || align=right | 1.5 km || 
|-id=015 bgcolor=#E9E9E9
| 447015 ||  || — || April 16, 2004 || Kitt Peak || Spacewatch || — || align=right | 2.5 km || 
|-id=016 bgcolor=#E9E9E9
| 447016 ||  || — || April 16, 2004 || Kitt Peak || Spacewatch || — || align=right | 1.4 km || 
|-id=017 bgcolor=#fefefe
| 447017 ||  || — || April 26, 2004 || Socorro || LINEAR || H || align=right data-sort-value="0.86" | 860 m || 
|-id=018 bgcolor=#fefefe
| 447018 ||  || — || May 19, 2004 || Campo Imperatore || CINEOS || — || align=right data-sort-value="0.88" | 880 m || 
|-id=019 bgcolor=#fefefe
| 447019 ||  || — || June 11, 2004 || Socorro || LINEAR || — || align=right | 1.7 km || 
|-id=020 bgcolor=#fefefe
| 447020 ||  || — || June 14, 2004 || Socorro || LINEAR || H || align=right data-sort-value="0.85" | 850 m || 
|-id=021 bgcolor=#d6d6d6
| 447021 ||  || — || June 11, 2004 || Kitt Peak || Spacewatch || — || align=right | 3.1 km || 
|-id=022 bgcolor=#FA8072
| 447022 ||  || — || July 9, 2004 || Socorro || LINEAR || — || align=right data-sort-value="0.62" | 620 m || 
|-id=023 bgcolor=#fefefe
| 447023 ||  || — || July 11, 2004 || Socorro || LINEAR || — || align=right data-sort-value="0.67" | 670 m || 
|-id=024 bgcolor=#fefefe
| 447024 ||  || — || July 18, 2004 || Socorro || LINEAR || — || align=right data-sort-value="0.82" | 820 m || 
|-id=025 bgcolor=#d6d6d6
| 447025 ||  || — || July 20, 2004 || Great Shefford || P. Birtwhistle || — || align=right | 2.9 km || 
|-id=026 bgcolor=#fefefe
| 447026 ||  || — || July 21, 2004 || Reedy Creek || J. Broughton || — || align=right data-sort-value="0.90" | 900 m || 
|-id=027 bgcolor=#fefefe
| 447027 ||  || — || July 18, 2004 || Campo Imperatore || CINEOS || NYS || align=right data-sort-value="0.57" | 570 m || 
|-id=028 bgcolor=#fefefe
| 447028 ||  || — || August 8, 2004 || Socorro || LINEAR || — || align=right data-sort-value="0.59" | 590 m || 
|-id=029 bgcolor=#fefefe
| 447029 ||  || — || August 8, 2004 || Anderson Mesa || LONEOS || — || align=right data-sort-value="0.97" | 970 m || 
|-id=030 bgcolor=#d6d6d6
| 447030 ||  || — || August 9, 2004 || Socorro || LINEAR || Tj (2.96) || align=right | 5.7 km || 
|-id=031 bgcolor=#fefefe
| 447031 ||  || — || August 8, 2004 || Socorro || LINEAR || NYS || align=right data-sort-value="0.60" | 600 m || 
|-id=032 bgcolor=#d6d6d6
| 447032 ||  || — || August 10, 2004 || Socorro || LINEAR || — || align=right | 3.6 km || 
|-id=033 bgcolor=#fefefe
| 447033 ||  || — || August 11, 2004 || Socorro || LINEAR || NYS || align=right data-sort-value="0.59" | 590 m || 
|-id=034 bgcolor=#d6d6d6
| 447034 ||  || — || August 25, 2004 || Kitt Peak || Spacewatch || (1298) || align=right | 2.0 km || 
|-id=035 bgcolor=#fefefe
| 447035 ||  || — || September 6, 2004 || Siding Spring || SSS || — || align=right data-sort-value="0.78" | 780 m || 
|-id=036 bgcolor=#fefefe
| 447036 ||  || — || September 7, 2004 || Socorro || LINEAR || — || align=right | 2.4 km || 
|-id=037 bgcolor=#fefefe
| 447037 ||  || — || September 7, 2004 || Kitt Peak || Spacewatch || — || align=right data-sort-value="0.62" | 620 m || 
|-id=038 bgcolor=#fefefe
| 447038 ||  || — || September 6, 2004 || Siding Spring || SSS || MAS || align=right data-sort-value="0.75" | 750 m || 
|-id=039 bgcolor=#fefefe
| 447039 ||  || — || September 8, 2004 || Socorro || LINEAR || — || align=right data-sort-value="0.90" | 900 m || 
|-id=040 bgcolor=#d6d6d6
| 447040 ||  || — || September 8, 2004 || Socorro || LINEAR || — || align=right | 3.2 km || 
|-id=041 bgcolor=#d6d6d6
| 447041 ||  || — || September 8, 2004 || Socorro || LINEAR || — || align=right | 3.0 km || 
|-id=042 bgcolor=#fefefe
| 447042 ||  || — || September 8, 2004 || Socorro || LINEAR || NYS || align=right data-sort-value="0.63" | 630 m || 
|-id=043 bgcolor=#fefefe
| 447043 ||  || — || September 8, 2004 || Socorro || LINEAR || — || align=right data-sort-value="0.92" | 920 m || 
|-id=044 bgcolor=#d6d6d6
| 447044 ||  || — || September 7, 2004 || Palomar || NEAT || — || align=right | 4.3 km || 
|-id=045 bgcolor=#d6d6d6
| 447045 ||  || — || August 21, 2004 || Catalina || CSS || — || align=right | 2.9 km || 
|-id=046 bgcolor=#d6d6d6
| 447046 ||  || — || September 7, 2004 || Kitt Peak || Spacewatch || EOS || align=right | 1.9 km || 
|-id=047 bgcolor=#d6d6d6
| 447047 ||  || — || September 8, 2004 || Socorro || LINEAR || — || align=right | 2.2 km || 
|-id=048 bgcolor=#fefefe
| 447048 ||  || — || September 10, 2004 || Socorro || LINEAR || — || align=right | 2.6 km || 
|-id=049 bgcolor=#d6d6d6
| 447049 ||  || — || September 10, 2004 || Kitt Peak || Spacewatch || EMA || align=right | 2.6 km || 
|-id=050 bgcolor=#d6d6d6
| 447050 ||  || — || September 9, 2004 || Kitt Peak || Spacewatch || — || align=right | 3.0 km || 
|-id=051 bgcolor=#d6d6d6
| 447051 ||  || — || September 10, 2004 || Socorro || LINEAR || — || align=right | 4.2 km || 
|-id=052 bgcolor=#d6d6d6
| 447052 ||  || — || September 11, 2004 || Socorro || LINEAR || — || align=right | 4.2 km || 
|-id=053 bgcolor=#d6d6d6
| 447053 ||  || — || September 8, 2004 || Socorro || LINEAR || — || align=right | 2.3 km || 
|-id=054 bgcolor=#d6d6d6
| 447054 ||  || — || September 9, 2004 || Kitt Peak || Spacewatch || — || align=right | 3.2 km || 
|-id=055 bgcolor=#d6d6d6
| 447055 ||  || — || September 9, 2004 || Kitt Peak || Spacewatch || — || align=right | 2.7 km || 
|-id=056 bgcolor=#d6d6d6
| 447056 ||  || — || September 9, 2004 || Kitt Peak || Spacewatch || — || align=right | 2.9 km || 
|-id=057 bgcolor=#fefefe
| 447057 ||  || — || September 10, 2004 || Kitt Peak || Spacewatch || — || align=right data-sort-value="0.63" | 630 m || 
|-id=058 bgcolor=#d6d6d6
| 447058 ||  || — || September 10, 2004 || Kitt Peak || Spacewatch || EOS || align=right | 1.9 km || 
|-id=059 bgcolor=#fefefe
| 447059 ||  || — || September 10, 2004 || Kitt Peak || Spacewatch || NYS || align=right data-sort-value="0.59" | 590 m || 
|-id=060 bgcolor=#fefefe
| 447060 ||  || — || September 13, 2004 || Socorro || LINEAR || H || align=right data-sort-value="0.61" | 610 m || 
|-id=061 bgcolor=#fefefe
| 447061 ||  || — || September 10, 2004 || Kitt Peak || Spacewatch || — || align=right data-sort-value="0.68" | 680 m || 
|-id=062 bgcolor=#d6d6d6
| 447062 ||  || — || September 10, 2004 || Kitt Peak || Spacewatch || — || align=right | 2.4 km || 
|-id=063 bgcolor=#d6d6d6
| 447063 ||  || — || September 11, 2004 || Kitt Peak || Spacewatch || — || align=right | 2.2 km || 
|-id=064 bgcolor=#fefefe
| 447064 ||  || — || September 15, 2004 || Kitt Peak || Spacewatch || — || align=right | 1.1 km || 
|-id=065 bgcolor=#d6d6d6
| 447065 ||  || — || September 12, 2004 || Kitt Peak || Spacewatch || — || align=right | 2.3 km || 
|-id=066 bgcolor=#fefefe
| 447066 ||  || — || August 11, 2004 || Socorro || LINEAR || — || align=right data-sort-value="0.86" | 860 m || 
|-id=067 bgcolor=#fefefe
| 447067 ||  || — || September 13, 2004 || Socorro || LINEAR || — || align=right data-sort-value="0.94" | 940 m || 
|-id=068 bgcolor=#d6d6d6
| 447068 ||  || — || September 10, 2004 || Socorro || LINEAR || — || align=right | 3.0 km || 
|-id=069 bgcolor=#fefefe
| 447069 ||  || — || September 13, 2004 || Socorro || LINEAR || H || align=right data-sort-value="0.50" | 500 m || 
|-id=070 bgcolor=#d6d6d6
| 447070 ||  || — || September 13, 2004 || Palomar || NEAT || EMA || align=right | 3.1 km || 
|-id=071 bgcolor=#d6d6d6
| 447071 ||  || — || September 7, 2004 || Kitt Peak || Spacewatch || — || align=right | 2.9 km || 
|-id=072 bgcolor=#d6d6d6
| 447072 ||  || — || September 15, 2004 || Socorro || LINEAR || — || align=right | 3.9 km || 
|-id=073 bgcolor=#d6d6d6
| 447073 ||  || — || September 7, 2004 || Kitt Peak || Spacewatch || — || align=right | 2.6 km || 
|-id=074 bgcolor=#d6d6d6
| 447074 ||  || — || September 17, 2004 || Socorro || LINEAR || — || align=right | 2.7 km || 
|-id=075 bgcolor=#d6d6d6
| 447075 ||  || — || September 21, 2004 || Socorro || LINEAR || Tj (2.97) || align=right | 3.0 km || 
|-id=076 bgcolor=#d6d6d6
| 447076 ||  || — || September 17, 2004 || Socorro || LINEAR || — || align=right | 7.3 km || 
|-id=077 bgcolor=#fefefe
| 447077 ||  || — || September 18, 2004 || Siding Spring || SSS || H || align=right data-sort-value="0.80" | 800 m || 
|-id=078 bgcolor=#fefefe
| 447078 ||  || — || October 4, 2004 || Wrightwood || J. W. Young || — || align=right | 1.8 km || 
|-id=079 bgcolor=#d6d6d6
| 447079 ||  || — || October 4, 2004 || Kitt Peak || Spacewatch || — || align=right | 2.3 km || 
|-id=080 bgcolor=#d6d6d6
| 447080 ||  || — || October 4, 2004 || Kitt Peak || Spacewatch || — || align=right | 2.9 km || 
|-id=081 bgcolor=#d6d6d6
| 447081 ||  || — || September 22, 2004 || Kitt Peak || Spacewatch || — || align=right | 2.6 km || 
|-id=082 bgcolor=#fefefe
| 447082 ||  || — || October 4, 2004 || Kitt Peak || Spacewatch || V || align=right data-sort-value="0.63" | 630 m || 
|-id=083 bgcolor=#d6d6d6
| 447083 ||  || — || October 4, 2004 || Kitt Peak || Spacewatch || — || align=right | 2.8 km || 
|-id=084 bgcolor=#d6d6d6
| 447084 ||  || — || October 4, 2004 || Kitt Peak || Spacewatch || — || align=right | 2.6 km || 
|-id=085 bgcolor=#fefefe
| 447085 ||  || — || October 4, 2004 || Kitt Peak || Spacewatch || NYS || align=right data-sort-value="0.63" | 630 m || 
|-id=086 bgcolor=#fefefe
| 447086 ||  || — || October 4, 2004 || Kitt Peak || Spacewatch || MAS || align=right data-sort-value="0.80" | 800 m || 
|-id=087 bgcolor=#d6d6d6
| 447087 ||  || — || October 4, 2004 || Kitt Peak || Spacewatch || — || align=right | 3.1 km || 
|-id=088 bgcolor=#fefefe
| 447088 ||  || — || October 5, 2004 || Anderson Mesa || LONEOS || — || align=right data-sort-value="0.88" | 880 m || 
|-id=089 bgcolor=#fefefe
| 447089 ||  || — || September 17, 2004 || Kitt Peak || Spacewatch || — || align=right data-sort-value="0.75" | 750 m || 
|-id=090 bgcolor=#d6d6d6
| 447090 ||  || — || August 23, 2004 || Siding Spring || SSS || — || align=right | 3.6 km || 
|-id=091 bgcolor=#d6d6d6
| 447091 ||  || — || October 5, 2004 || Anderson Mesa || LONEOS || — || align=right | 4.0 km || 
|-id=092 bgcolor=#d6d6d6
| 447092 ||  || — || October 5, 2004 || Kitt Peak || Spacewatch || THM || align=right | 1.6 km || 
|-id=093 bgcolor=#d6d6d6
| 447093 ||  || — || October 5, 2004 || Kitt Peak || Spacewatch || — || align=right | 3.3 km || 
|-id=094 bgcolor=#d6d6d6
| 447094 ||  || — || October 6, 2004 || Palomar || NEAT || — || align=right | 3.6 km || 
|-id=095 bgcolor=#d6d6d6
| 447095 ||  || — || October 7, 2004 || Kitt Peak || Spacewatch || — || align=right | 3.4 km || 
|-id=096 bgcolor=#d6d6d6
| 447096 ||  || — || October 5, 2004 || Palomar || NEAT || — || align=right | 4.9 km || 
|-id=097 bgcolor=#fefefe
| 447097 ||  || — || September 21, 2004 || Anderson Mesa || LONEOS || — || align=right data-sort-value="0.94" | 940 m || 
|-id=098 bgcolor=#d6d6d6
| 447098 ||  || — || October 7, 2004 || Socorro || LINEAR || — || align=right | 2.7 km || 
|-id=099 bgcolor=#d6d6d6
| 447099 ||  || — || October 8, 2004 || Anderson Mesa || LONEOS || — || align=right | 2.9 km || 
|-id=100 bgcolor=#fefefe
| 447100 ||  || — || September 22, 2004 || Socorro || LINEAR || — || align=right data-sort-value="0.65" | 650 m || 
|}

447101–447200 

|-bgcolor=#fefefe
| 447101 ||  || — || September 23, 2004 || Kitt Peak || Spacewatch || — || align=right data-sort-value="0.86" | 860 m || 
|-id=102 bgcolor=#fefefe
| 447102 ||  || — || October 6, 2004 || Kitt Peak || Spacewatch || — || align=right data-sort-value="0.65" | 650 m || 
|-id=103 bgcolor=#d6d6d6
| 447103 ||  || — || October 6, 2004 || Kitt Peak || Spacewatch || — || align=right | 2.3 km || 
|-id=104 bgcolor=#d6d6d6
| 447104 ||  || — || October 6, 2004 || Kitt Peak || Spacewatch || THM || align=right | 2.2 km || 
|-id=105 bgcolor=#d6d6d6
| 447105 ||  || — || October 8, 2004 || Socorro || LINEAR || — || align=right | 4.7 km || 
|-id=106 bgcolor=#fefefe
| 447106 ||  || — || October 9, 2004 || Socorro || LINEAR || — || align=right data-sort-value="0.82" | 820 m || 
|-id=107 bgcolor=#fefefe
| 447107 ||  || — || January 19, 2002 || Kitt Peak || Spacewatch || MAS || align=right data-sort-value="0.65" | 650 m || 
|-id=108 bgcolor=#d6d6d6
| 447108 ||  || — || October 7, 2004 || Kitt Peak || Spacewatch || — || align=right | 5.5 km || 
|-id=109 bgcolor=#d6d6d6
| 447109 ||  || — || September 23, 2004 || Kitt Peak || Spacewatch || THM || align=right | 1.8 km || 
|-id=110 bgcolor=#fefefe
| 447110 ||  || — || October 7, 2004 || Kitt Peak || Spacewatch || — || align=right data-sort-value="0.85" | 850 m || 
|-id=111 bgcolor=#d6d6d6
| 447111 ||  || — || October 7, 2004 || Kitt Peak || Spacewatch || — || align=right | 3.4 km || 
|-id=112 bgcolor=#d6d6d6
| 447112 ||  || — || October 7, 2004 || Kitt Peak || Spacewatch || TIR || align=right | 3.1 km || 
|-id=113 bgcolor=#d6d6d6
| 447113 ||  || — || October 9, 2004 || Socorro || LINEAR || — || align=right | 2.6 km || 
|-id=114 bgcolor=#fefefe
| 447114 ||  || — || October 9, 2004 || Socorro || LINEAR || — || align=right data-sort-value="0.96" | 960 m || 
|-id=115 bgcolor=#d6d6d6
| 447115 ||  || — || September 18, 2004 || Socorro || LINEAR || — || align=right | 2.4 km || 
|-id=116 bgcolor=#d6d6d6
| 447116 ||  || — || October 9, 2004 || Kitt Peak || Spacewatch || — || align=right | 2.7 km || 
|-id=117 bgcolor=#fefefe
| 447117 ||  || — || October 9, 2004 || Kitt Peak || Spacewatch || MAS || align=right data-sort-value="0.75" | 750 m || 
|-id=118 bgcolor=#fefefe
| 447118 ||  || — || October 9, 2004 || Kitt Peak || Spacewatch || NYS || align=right data-sort-value="0.58" | 580 m || 
|-id=119 bgcolor=#d6d6d6
| 447119 ||  || — || October 10, 2004 || Kitt Peak || Spacewatch || LIX || align=right | 3.6 km || 
|-id=120 bgcolor=#fefefe
| 447120 ||  || — || October 10, 2004 || Kitt Peak || Spacewatch || — || align=right data-sort-value="0.68" | 680 m || 
|-id=121 bgcolor=#d6d6d6
| 447121 ||  || — || October 13, 2004 || Kitt Peak || Spacewatch || — || align=right | 3.3 km || 
|-id=122 bgcolor=#d6d6d6
| 447122 ||  || — || September 21, 2004 || Anderson Mesa || LONEOS || — || align=right | 3.1 km || 
|-id=123 bgcolor=#d6d6d6
| 447123 ||  || — || October 9, 2004 || Kitt Peak || Spacewatch || — || align=right | 3.6 km || 
|-id=124 bgcolor=#d6d6d6
| 447124 ||  || — || November 3, 2004 || Anderson Mesa || LONEOS || — || align=right | 2.7 km || 
|-id=125 bgcolor=#d6d6d6
| 447125 ||  || — || October 23, 2004 || Kitt Peak || Spacewatch || — || align=right | 3.7 km || 
|-id=126 bgcolor=#d6d6d6
| 447126 ||  || — || November 5, 2004 || Kitt Peak || Spacewatch || HYG || align=right | 2.5 km || 
|-id=127 bgcolor=#d6d6d6
| 447127 ||  || — || October 7, 2004 || Kitt Peak || Spacewatch || LIX || align=right | 3.8 km || 
|-id=128 bgcolor=#d6d6d6
| 447128 ||  || — || October 10, 2004 || Kitt Peak || Spacewatch || — || align=right | 2.8 km || 
|-id=129 bgcolor=#d6d6d6
| 447129 ||  || — || November 4, 2004 || Kitt Peak || Spacewatch || — || align=right | 4.5 km || 
|-id=130 bgcolor=#d6d6d6
| 447130 ||  || — || December 2, 2004 || Catalina || CSS || — || align=right | 3.9 km || 
|-id=131 bgcolor=#d6d6d6
| 447131 ||  || — || December 3, 2004 || Palomar || NEAT || — || align=right | 5.3 km || 
|-id=132 bgcolor=#d6d6d6
| 447132 ||  || — || November 10, 2004 || Kitt Peak || Spacewatch || — || align=right | 3.2 km || 
|-id=133 bgcolor=#fefefe
| 447133 ||  || — || December 11, 2004 || Kitt Peak || Spacewatch || — || align=right data-sort-value="0.69" | 690 m || 
|-id=134 bgcolor=#fefefe
| 447134 ||  || — || December 9, 2004 || Kitt Peak || Spacewatch || — || align=right data-sort-value="0.76" | 760 m || 
|-id=135 bgcolor=#d6d6d6
| 447135 ||  || — || December 10, 2004 || Kitt Peak || Spacewatch || Tj (2.99) || align=right | 4.2 km || 
|-id=136 bgcolor=#fefefe
| 447136 ||  || — || December 11, 2004 || Socorro || LINEAR || — || align=right | 1.0 km || 
|-id=137 bgcolor=#fefefe
| 447137 ||  || — || December 18, 2004 || Mount Lemmon || Mount Lemmon Survey || — || align=right data-sort-value="0.90" | 900 m || 
|-id=138 bgcolor=#fefefe
| 447138 ||  || — || January 15, 2005 || Kitt Peak || Spacewatch || — || align=right data-sort-value="0.78" | 780 m || 
|-id=139 bgcolor=#fefefe
| 447139 ||  || — || January 8, 2005 || Campo Imperatore || CINEOS || — || align=right | 1.1 km || 
|-id=140 bgcolor=#E9E9E9
| 447140 ||  || — || March 3, 2005 || Catalina || CSS || — || align=right | 1.4 km || 
|-id=141 bgcolor=#fefefe
| 447141 ||  || — || March 2, 2005 || Kitt Peak || Spacewatch || — || align=right data-sort-value="0.85" | 850 m || 
|-id=142 bgcolor=#E9E9E9
| 447142 ||  || — || February 3, 2005 || Socorro || LINEAR || — || align=right | 1.1 km || 
|-id=143 bgcolor=#d6d6d6
| 447143 ||  || — || March 4, 2005 || Kitt Peak || Spacewatch || 3:2 || align=right | 5.1 km || 
|-id=144 bgcolor=#E9E9E9
| 447144 ||  || — || March 12, 2005 || Kitt Peak || Spacewatch || — || align=right data-sort-value="0.88" | 880 m || 
|-id=145 bgcolor=#E9E9E9
| 447145 ||  || — || March 8, 2005 || Mount Lemmon || Mount Lemmon Survey || — || align=right | 1.3 km || 
|-id=146 bgcolor=#FA8072
| 447146 ||  || — || April 2, 2005 || Mount Lemmon || Mount Lemmon Survey || — || align=right data-sort-value="0.59" | 590 m || 
|-id=147 bgcolor=#E9E9E9
| 447147 ||  || — || April 4, 2005 || Mount Lemmon || Mount Lemmon Survey || — || align=right | 1.5 km || 
|-id=148 bgcolor=#E9E9E9
| 447148 ||  || — || March 30, 2005 || Catalina || CSS || — || align=right | 1.9 km || 
|-id=149 bgcolor=#E9E9E9
| 447149 ||  || — || April 6, 2005 || Catalina || CSS || EUN || align=right | 1.6 km || 
|-id=150 bgcolor=#E9E9E9
| 447150 ||  || — || April 6, 2005 || Kitt Peak || Spacewatch || — || align=right | 1.4 km || 
|-id=151 bgcolor=#E9E9E9
| 447151 ||  || — || April 6, 2005 || Kitt Peak || Spacewatch || — || align=right | 1.4 km || 
|-id=152 bgcolor=#E9E9E9
| 447152 ||  || — || April 5, 2005 || Mount Lemmon || Mount Lemmon Survey || — || align=right data-sort-value="0.88" | 880 m || 
|-id=153 bgcolor=#E9E9E9
| 447153 ||  || — || April 15, 2005 || Kitt Peak || Spacewatch || — || align=right | 1.2 km || 
|-id=154 bgcolor=#E9E9E9
| 447154 ||  || — || April 15, 2005 || Anderson Mesa || LONEOS || JUN || align=right | 1.1 km || 
|-id=155 bgcolor=#E9E9E9
| 447155 ||  || — || April 16, 2005 || Kitt Peak || Spacewatch || — || align=right | 2.5 km || 
|-id=156 bgcolor=#E9E9E9
| 447156 ||  || — || April 16, 2005 || Kitt Peak || Spacewatch || — || align=right | 2.2 km || 
|-id=157 bgcolor=#E9E9E9
| 447157 ||  || — || May 3, 2005 || Catalina || CSS || — || align=right | 2.2 km || 
|-id=158 bgcolor=#E9E9E9
| 447158 ||  || — || May 4, 2005 || Anderson Mesa || LONEOS || EUN || align=right | 1.4 km || 
|-id=159 bgcolor=#E9E9E9
| 447159 ||  || — || May 4, 2005 || Catalina || CSS || JUN || align=right | 1.2 km || 
|-id=160 bgcolor=#E9E9E9
| 447160 ||  || — || May 7, 2005 || Kitt Peak || Spacewatch || — || align=right | 2.1 km || 
|-id=161 bgcolor=#E9E9E9
| 447161 ||  || — || April 30, 2005 || Kitt Peak || Spacewatch || — || align=right | 2.1 km || 
|-id=162 bgcolor=#E9E9E9
| 447162 ||  || — || May 3, 2005 || Kitt Peak || Spacewatch || EUN || align=right | 1.2 km || 
|-id=163 bgcolor=#E9E9E9
| 447163 ||  || — || May 15, 2005 || Mount Lemmon || Mount Lemmon Survey || ADE || align=right | 2.6 km || 
|-id=164 bgcolor=#E9E9E9
| 447164 ||  || — || May 8, 2005 || Kitt Peak || Spacewatch || — || align=right | 2.0 km || 
|-id=165 bgcolor=#E9E9E9
| 447165 ||  || — || May 3, 2005 || Kitt Peak || Spacewatch || — || align=right | 1.7 km || 
|-id=166 bgcolor=#E9E9E9
| 447166 ||  || — || May 10, 2005 || Kitt Peak || Spacewatch || — || align=right | 1.6 km || 
|-id=167 bgcolor=#E9E9E9
| 447167 ||  || — || June 8, 2005 || Kitt Peak || Spacewatch || — || align=right | 1.8 km || 
|-id=168 bgcolor=#E9E9E9
| 447168 ||  || — || June 30, 2005 || Kitt Peak || Spacewatch || — || align=right | 2.0 km || 
|-id=169 bgcolor=#E9E9E9
| 447169 ||  || — || July 5, 2005 || Palomar || NEAT || GEF || align=right | 1.1 km || 
|-id=170 bgcolor=#E9E9E9
| 447170 ||  || — || June 18, 2005 || Mount Lemmon || Mount Lemmon Survey || — || align=right | 2.6 km || 
|-id=171 bgcolor=#E9E9E9
| 447171 ||  || — || July 1, 2005 || Kitt Peak || Spacewatch || — || align=right | 2.0 km || 
|-id=172 bgcolor=#FA8072
| 447172 ||  || — || July 10, 2005 || Kitt Peak || Spacewatch || — || align=right data-sort-value="0.53" | 530 m || 
|-id=173 bgcolor=#fefefe
| 447173 ||  || — || June 13, 2005 || Mount Lemmon || Mount Lemmon Survey || — || align=right data-sort-value="0.64" | 640 m || 
|-id=174 bgcolor=#d6d6d6
| 447174 ||  || — || August 27, 2005 || Kitt Peak || Spacewatch || KOR || align=right | 1.3 km || 
|-id=175 bgcolor=#FA8072
| 447175 ||  || — || August 26, 2005 || Palomar || NEAT || — || align=right data-sort-value="0.62" | 620 m || 
|-id=176 bgcolor=#fefefe
| 447176 ||  || — || August 27, 2005 || Anderson Mesa || LONEOS || H || align=right data-sort-value="0.81" | 810 m || 
|-id=177 bgcolor=#d6d6d6
| 447177 ||  || — || August 28, 2005 || Kitt Peak || Spacewatch || KOR || align=right | 1.3 km || 
|-id=178 bgcolor=#C7FF8F
| 447178 ||  || — || September 3, 2005 || Apache Point || A. C. Becker, A. W. Puckett, J. Kubica || centaur || align=right | 158 km || 
|-id=179 bgcolor=#fefefe
| 447179 ||  || — || September 23, 2005 || Kitt Peak || Spacewatch || — || align=right data-sort-value="0.74" | 740 m || 
|-id=180 bgcolor=#fefefe
| 447180 ||  || — || September 24, 2005 || Kitt Peak || Spacewatch || — || align=right data-sort-value="0.87" | 870 m || 
|-id=181 bgcolor=#d6d6d6
| 447181 ||  || — || September 25, 2005 || Kitt Peak || Spacewatch || — || align=right | 2.2 km || 
|-id=182 bgcolor=#d6d6d6
| 447182 ||  || — || September 27, 2005 || Kitt Peak || Spacewatch || EOS || align=right | 1.6 km || 
|-id=183 bgcolor=#d6d6d6
| 447183 ||  || — || September 24, 2005 || Kitt Peak || Spacewatch || — || align=right | 2.5 km || 
|-id=184 bgcolor=#d6d6d6
| 447184 ||  || — || September 24, 2005 || Kitt Peak || Spacewatch || — || align=right | 1.8 km || 
|-id=185 bgcolor=#d6d6d6
| 447185 ||  || — || September 25, 2005 || Kitt Peak || Spacewatch || — || align=right | 2.2 km || 
|-id=186 bgcolor=#fefefe
| 447186 ||  || — || September 1, 2005 || Anderson Mesa || LONEOS || — || align=right data-sort-value="0.94" | 940 m || 
|-id=187 bgcolor=#fefefe
| 447187 ||  || — || September 26, 2005 || Kitt Peak || Spacewatch || — || align=right data-sort-value="0.64" | 640 m || 
|-id=188 bgcolor=#d6d6d6
| 447188 ||  || — || September 23, 2005 || Catalina || CSS || — || align=right | 2.5 km || 
|-id=189 bgcolor=#d6d6d6
| 447189 ||  || — || September 27, 2005 || Kitt Peak || Spacewatch || — || align=right | 2.6 km || 
|-id=190 bgcolor=#fefefe
| 447190 ||  || — || September 29, 2005 || Mount Lemmon || Mount Lemmon Survey || — || align=right data-sort-value="0.67" | 670 m || 
|-id=191 bgcolor=#d6d6d6
| 447191 ||  || — || September 29, 2005 || Mount Lemmon || Mount Lemmon Survey || — || align=right | 2.8 km || 
|-id=192 bgcolor=#d6d6d6
| 447192 ||  || — || September 27, 2005 || Kitt Peak || Spacewatch || KOR || align=right | 1.2 km || 
|-id=193 bgcolor=#d6d6d6
| 447193 ||  || — || September 29, 2005 || Mount Lemmon || Mount Lemmon Survey || KOR || align=right | 1.2 km || 
|-id=194 bgcolor=#fefefe
| 447194 ||  || — || September 23, 2005 || Kitt Peak || Spacewatch || — || align=right data-sort-value="0.78" | 780 m || 
|-id=195 bgcolor=#d6d6d6
| 447195 ||  || — || September 29, 2005 || Mount Lemmon || Mount Lemmon Survey || KOR || align=right | 1.3 km || 
|-id=196 bgcolor=#d6d6d6
| 447196 ||  || — || September 29, 2005 || Mount Lemmon || Mount Lemmon Survey || — || align=right | 1.7 km || 
|-id=197 bgcolor=#fefefe
| 447197 ||  || — || September 30, 2005 || Kitt Peak || Spacewatch || — || align=right data-sort-value="0.56" | 560 m || 
|-id=198 bgcolor=#fefefe
| 447198 ||  || — || September 30, 2005 || Kitt Peak || Spacewatch || — || align=right data-sort-value="0.63" | 630 m || 
|-id=199 bgcolor=#d6d6d6
| 447199 ||  || — || September 30, 2005 || Palomar || NEAT || — || align=right | 2.8 km || 
|-id=200 bgcolor=#E9E9E9
| 447200 ||  || — || September 30, 2005 || Mount Lemmon || Mount Lemmon Survey || — || align=right | 2.0 km || 
|}

447201–447300 

|-bgcolor=#fefefe
| 447201 ||  || — || September 25, 2005 || Kitt Peak || Spacewatch || — || align=right data-sort-value="0.50" | 500 m || 
|-id=202 bgcolor=#fefefe
| 447202 ||  || — || September 24, 2005 || Anderson Mesa || LONEOS || — || align=right data-sort-value="0.78" | 780 m || 
|-id=203 bgcolor=#d6d6d6
| 447203 ||  || — || September 23, 2005 || Kitt Peak || Spacewatch || KOR || align=right | 1.5 km || 
|-id=204 bgcolor=#d6d6d6
| 447204 ||  || — || September 23, 2005 || Kitt Peak || Spacewatch || — || align=right | 2.4 km || 
|-id=205 bgcolor=#d6d6d6
| 447205 ||  || — || October 1, 2005 || Kitt Peak || Spacewatch || EOS || align=right | 1.4 km || 
|-id=206 bgcolor=#d6d6d6
| 447206 ||  || — || October 1, 2005 || Mount Lemmon || Mount Lemmon Survey || — || align=right | 2.3 km || 
|-id=207 bgcolor=#d6d6d6
| 447207 ||  || — || October 7, 2005 || Goodricke-Pigott || R. A. Tucker || EOS || align=right | 2.4 km || 
|-id=208 bgcolor=#d6d6d6
| 447208 ||  || — || October 1, 2005 || Socorro || LINEAR || — || align=right | 2.5 km || 
|-id=209 bgcolor=#fefefe
| 447209 ||  || — || October 1, 2005 || Kitt Peak || Spacewatch || — || align=right data-sort-value="0.72" | 720 m || 
|-id=210 bgcolor=#d6d6d6
| 447210 ||  || — || October 1, 2005 || Mount Lemmon || Mount Lemmon Survey || — || align=right | 2.7 km || 
|-id=211 bgcolor=#fefefe
| 447211 ||  || — || October 2, 2005 || Mount Lemmon || Mount Lemmon Survey || — || align=right data-sort-value="0.82" | 820 m || 
|-id=212 bgcolor=#fefefe
| 447212 ||  || — || October 4, 2005 || Mount Lemmon || Mount Lemmon Survey || — || align=right data-sort-value="0.73" | 730 m || 
|-id=213 bgcolor=#d6d6d6
| 447213 ||  || — || October 6, 2005 || Anderson Mesa || LONEOS || — || align=right | 2.7 km || 
|-id=214 bgcolor=#d6d6d6
| 447214 ||  || — || October 6, 2005 || Mount Lemmon || Mount Lemmon Survey || — || align=right | 3.3 km || 
|-id=215 bgcolor=#d6d6d6
| 447215 ||  || — || October 7, 2005 || Kitt Peak || Spacewatch || KOR || align=right | 1.0 km || 
|-id=216 bgcolor=#d6d6d6
| 447216 ||  || — || October 7, 2005 || Kitt Peak || Spacewatch || — || align=right | 2.1 km || 
|-id=217 bgcolor=#d6d6d6
| 447217 ||  || — || October 9, 2005 || Kitt Peak || Spacewatch || KOR || align=right | 1.1 km || 
|-id=218 bgcolor=#d6d6d6
| 447218 ||  || — || October 10, 2005 || Catalina || CSS || — || align=right | 3.0 km || 
|-id=219 bgcolor=#fefefe
| 447219 ||  || — || September 12, 2005 || Kitt Peak || Spacewatch || — || align=right data-sort-value="0.59" | 590 m || 
|-id=220 bgcolor=#d6d6d6
| 447220 ||  || — || October 6, 2005 || Mount Lemmon || Mount Lemmon Survey || — || align=right | 2.1 km || 
|-id=221 bgcolor=#FFC2E0
| 447221 ||  || — || October 27, 2005 || Siding Spring || SSS || APO || align=right data-sort-value="0.26" | 260 m || 
|-id=222 bgcolor=#fefefe
| 447222 ||  || — || October 22, 2005 || Kitt Peak || Spacewatch || — || align=right data-sort-value="0.65" | 650 m || 
|-id=223 bgcolor=#fefefe
| 447223 ||  || — || October 22, 2005 || Kitt Peak || Spacewatch || — || align=right data-sort-value="0.56" | 560 m || 
|-id=224 bgcolor=#d6d6d6
| 447224 ||  || — || October 23, 2005 || Catalina || CSS || — || align=right | 3.0 km || 
|-id=225 bgcolor=#d6d6d6
| 447225 ||  || — || October 24, 2005 || Kitt Peak || Spacewatch || EOS || align=right | 1.5 km || 
|-id=226 bgcolor=#fefefe
| 447226 ||  || — || October 25, 2005 || Anderson Mesa || LONEOS || (2076) || align=right data-sort-value="0.94" | 940 m || 
|-id=227 bgcolor=#d6d6d6
| 447227 ||  || — || October 11, 2005 || Kitt Peak || Spacewatch || KOR || align=right data-sort-value="0.96" | 960 m || 
|-id=228 bgcolor=#d6d6d6
| 447228 ||  || — || September 29, 2005 || Mount Lemmon || Mount Lemmon Survey || KOR || align=right | 1.2 km || 
|-id=229 bgcolor=#fefefe
| 447229 ||  || — || October 22, 2005 || Kitt Peak || Spacewatch || — || align=right data-sort-value="0.58" | 580 m || 
|-id=230 bgcolor=#d6d6d6
| 447230 ||  || — || October 22, 2005 || Kitt Peak || Spacewatch || — || align=right | 1.9 km || 
|-id=231 bgcolor=#d6d6d6
| 447231 ||  || — || October 22, 2005 || Kitt Peak || Spacewatch || — || align=right | 1.9 km || 
|-id=232 bgcolor=#d6d6d6
| 447232 ||  || — || October 24, 2005 || Kitt Peak || Spacewatch || — || align=right | 2.2 km || 
|-id=233 bgcolor=#d6d6d6
| 447233 ||  || — || October 24, 2005 || Kitt Peak || Spacewatch || — || align=right | 2.1 km || 
|-id=234 bgcolor=#fefefe
| 447234 ||  || — || October 24, 2005 || Kitt Peak || Spacewatch || — || align=right data-sort-value="0.66" | 660 m || 
|-id=235 bgcolor=#d6d6d6
| 447235 ||  || — || October 12, 2005 || Kitt Peak || Spacewatch || — || align=right | 2.5 km || 
|-id=236 bgcolor=#d6d6d6
| 447236 ||  || — || October 24, 2005 || Kitt Peak || Spacewatch || — || align=right | 2.1 km || 
|-id=237 bgcolor=#d6d6d6
| 447237 ||  || — || October 24, 2005 || Kitt Peak || Spacewatch || — || align=right | 2.5 km || 
|-id=238 bgcolor=#d6d6d6
| 447238 ||  || — || October 27, 2005 || Mount Lemmon || Mount Lemmon Survey || — || align=right | 2.2 km || 
|-id=239 bgcolor=#fefefe
| 447239 ||  || — || October 25, 2005 || Kitt Peak || Spacewatch || critical || align=right data-sort-value="0.68" | 680 m || 
|-id=240 bgcolor=#d6d6d6
| 447240 ||  || — || October 25, 2005 || Kitt Peak || Spacewatch || — || align=right | 2.5 km || 
|-id=241 bgcolor=#d6d6d6
| 447241 ||  || — || October 25, 2005 || Kitt Peak || Spacewatch || TEL || align=right | 3.1 km || 
|-id=242 bgcolor=#d6d6d6
| 447242 ||  || — || October 25, 2005 || Mount Lemmon || Mount Lemmon Survey || — || align=right | 2.4 km || 
|-id=243 bgcolor=#d6d6d6
| 447243 ||  || — || October 27, 2005 || Kitt Peak || Spacewatch || — || align=right | 1.6 km || 
|-id=244 bgcolor=#d6d6d6
| 447244 ||  || — || October 27, 2005 || Kitt Peak || Spacewatch || — || align=right | 2.3 km || 
|-id=245 bgcolor=#fefefe
| 447245 ||  || — || October 27, 2005 || Kitt Peak || Spacewatch || critical || align=right data-sort-value="0.54" | 540 m || 
|-id=246 bgcolor=#d6d6d6
| 447246 ||  || — || October 22, 2005 || Palomar || NEAT || — || align=right | 4.3 km || 
|-id=247 bgcolor=#fefefe
| 447247 ||  || — || October 25, 2005 || Kitt Peak || Spacewatch || critical || align=right data-sort-value="0.52" | 520 m || 
|-id=248 bgcolor=#fefefe
| 447248 ||  || — || October 25, 2005 || Kitt Peak || Spacewatch || — || align=right data-sort-value="0.55" | 550 m || 
|-id=249 bgcolor=#fefefe
| 447249 ||  || — || October 25, 2005 || Kitt Peak || Spacewatch || — || align=right data-sort-value="0.67" | 670 m || 
|-id=250 bgcolor=#fefefe
| 447250 ||  || — || October 25, 2005 || Kitt Peak || Spacewatch || — || align=right data-sort-value="0.81" | 810 m || 
|-id=251 bgcolor=#d6d6d6
| 447251 ||  || — || October 28, 2005 || Mount Lemmon || Mount Lemmon Survey || — || align=right | 2.4 km || 
|-id=252 bgcolor=#fefefe
| 447252 ||  || — || September 23, 2005 || Kitt Peak || Spacewatch || — || align=right data-sort-value="0.77" | 770 m || 
|-id=253 bgcolor=#d6d6d6
| 447253 ||  || — || October 12, 2005 || Kitt Peak || Spacewatch || — || align=right | 2.3 km || 
|-id=254 bgcolor=#d6d6d6
| 447254 ||  || — || October 5, 2005 || Kitt Peak || Spacewatch || — || align=right | 2.0 km || 
|-id=255 bgcolor=#d6d6d6
| 447255 ||  || — || October 26, 2005 || Kitt Peak || Spacewatch || — || align=right | 2.7 km || 
|-id=256 bgcolor=#d6d6d6
| 447256 ||  || — || October 26, 2005 || Kitt Peak || Spacewatch || — || align=right | 2.1 km || 
|-id=257 bgcolor=#fefefe
| 447257 ||  || — || October 26, 2005 || Kitt Peak || Spacewatch || — || align=right data-sort-value="0.71" | 710 m || 
|-id=258 bgcolor=#d6d6d6
| 447258 ||  || — || October 29, 2005 || Mount Lemmon || Mount Lemmon Survey || — || align=right | 2.2 km || 
|-id=259 bgcolor=#d6d6d6
| 447259 ||  || — || October 22, 2005 || Kitt Peak || Spacewatch || — || align=right | 2.2 km || 
|-id=260 bgcolor=#d6d6d6
| 447260 ||  || — || October 28, 2005 || Mount Lemmon || Mount Lemmon Survey || — || align=right | 3.2 km || 
|-id=261 bgcolor=#fefefe
| 447261 ||  || — || October 29, 2005 || Mount Lemmon || Mount Lemmon Survey || — || align=right data-sort-value="0.68" | 680 m || 
|-id=262 bgcolor=#fefefe
| 447262 ||  || — || October 29, 2005 || Mount Lemmon || Mount Lemmon Survey || — || align=right data-sort-value="0.65" | 650 m || 
|-id=263 bgcolor=#d6d6d6
| 447263 ||  || — || October 29, 2005 || Kitt Peak || Spacewatch || — || align=right | 2.0 km || 
|-id=264 bgcolor=#d6d6d6
| 447264 ||  || — || October 30, 2005 || Kitt Peak || Spacewatch || — || align=right | 4.4 km || 
|-id=265 bgcolor=#fefefe
| 447265 ||  || — || October 30, 2005 || Kitt Peak || Spacewatch || critical || align=right data-sort-value="0.62" | 620 m || 
|-id=266 bgcolor=#fefefe
| 447266 ||  || — || October 22, 2005 || Kitt Peak || Spacewatch || — || align=right data-sort-value="0.90" | 900 m || 
|-id=267 bgcolor=#fefefe
| 447267 ||  || — || October 22, 2005 || Kitt Peak || Spacewatch || — || align=right data-sort-value="0.65" | 650 m || 
|-id=268 bgcolor=#fefefe
| 447268 ||  || — || October 28, 2005 || Mount Lemmon || Mount Lemmon Survey || — || align=right data-sort-value="0.67" | 670 m || 
|-id=269 bgcolor=#d6d6d6
| 447269 ||  || — || October 25, 2005 || Kitt Peak || Spacewatch || — || align=right | 3.1 km || 
|-id=270 bgcolor=#d6d6d6
| 447270 ||  || — || October 28, 2005 || Kitt Peak || Spacewatch || EOS || align=right | 1.5 km || 
|-id=271 bgcolor=#d6d6d6
| 447271 ||  || — || October 28, 2005 || Kitt Peak || Spacewatch || — || align=right | 2.1 km || 
|-id=272 bgcolor=#d6d6d6
| 447272 ||  || — || October 28, 2005 || Mount Lemmon || Mount Lemmon Survey || — || align=right | 2.2 km || 
|-id=273 bgcolor=#fefefe
| 447273 ||  || — || October 28, 2005 || Kitt Peak || Spacewatch || — || align=right data-sort-value="0.62" | 620 m || 
|-id=274 bgcolor=#fefefe
| 447274 ||  || — || October 30, 2005 || Catalina || CSS || — || align=right data-sort-value="0.62" | 620 m || 
|-id=275 bgcolor=#d6d6d6
| 447275 ||  || — || October 31, 2005 || Mount Lemmon || Mount Lemmon Survey || — || align=right | 5.5 km || 
|-id=276 bgcolor=#d6d6d6
| 447276 ||  || — || October 30, 2005 || Socorro || LINEAR || EOS || align=right | 2.3 km || 
|-id=277 bgcolor=#d6d6d6
| 447277 ||  || — || September 29, 2005 || Catalina || CSS || — || align=right | 2.2 km || 
|-id=278 bgcolor=#d6d6d6
| 447278 ||  || — || October 30, 2005 || Mount Lemmon || Mount Lemmon Survey || TEL || align=right | 1.1 km || 
|-id=279 bgcolor=#d6d6d6
| 447279 ||  || — || October 28, 2005 || Kitt Peak || Spacewatch || EOS || align=right | 2.1 km || 
|-id=280 bgcolor=#d6d6d6
| 447280 ||  || — || October 22, 2005 || Apache Point || A. C. Becker || BRA || align=right | 1.4 km || 
|-id=281 bgcolor=#FA8072
| 447281 ||  || — || October 2, 2005 || Anderson Mesa || LONEOS || — || align=right data-sort-value="0.84" | 840 m || 
|-id=282 bgcolor=#d6d6d6
| 447282 ||  || — || November 1, 2005 || Kitt Peak || Spacewatch || EOS || align=right | 1.3 km || 
|-id=283 bgcolor=#fefefe
| 447283 ||  || — || November 2, 2005 || Socorro || LINEAR || — || align=right | 1.1 km || 
|-id=284 bgcolor=#fefefe
| 447284 ||  || — || October 26, 2005 || Kitt Peak || Spacewatch || — || align=right data-sort-value="0.59" | 590 m || 
|-id=285 bgcolor=#d6d6d6
| 447285 ||  || — || October 28, 2005 || Kitt Peak || Spacewatch || — || align=right | 3.8 km || 
|-id=286 bgcolor=#d6d6d6
| 447286 ||  || — || November 22, 2005 || Wrightwood || J. W. Young || — || align=right | 3.0 km || 
|-id=287 bgcolor=#d6d6d6
| 447287 ||  || — || November 21, 2005 || Kitt Peak || Spacewatch || — || align=right | 2.2 km || 
|-id=288 bgcolor=#d6d6d6
| 447288 ||  || — || October 27, 2005 || Mount Lemmon || Mount Lemmon Survey || EOS || align=right | 1.6 km || 
|-id=289 bgcolor=#d6d6d6
| 447289 ||  || — || November 21, 2005 || Kitt Peak || Spacewatch || — || align=right | 3.4 km || 
|-id=290 bgcolor=#fefefe
| 447290 ||  || — || November 22, 2005 || Kitt Peak || Spacewatch || — || align=right data-sort-value="0.77" | 770 m || 
|-id=291 bgcolor=#fefefe
| 447291 ||  || — || November 22, 2005 || Kitt Peak || Spacewatch || — || align=right data-sort-value="0.51" | 510 m || 
|-id=292 bgcolor=#d6d6d6
| 447292 ||  || — || November 22, 2005 || Kitt Peak || Spacewatch || TEL || align=right | 1.2 km || 
|-id=293 bgcolor=#d6d6d6
| 447293 ||  || — || November 25, 2005 || Kitt Peak || Spacewatch || — || align=right | 2.9 km || 
|-id=294 bgcolor=#d6d6d6
| 447294 ||  || — || November 25, 2005 || Catalina || CSS || — || align=right | 3.3 km || 
|-id=295 bgcolor=#d6d6d6
| 447295 ||  || — || November 22, 2005 || Kitt Peak || Spacewatch || — || align=right | 3.1 km || 
|-id=296 bgcolor=#fefefe
| 447296 ||  || — || November 25, 2005 || Kitt Peak || Spacewatch || — || align=right data-sort-value="0.63" | 630 m || 
|-id=297 bgcolor=#d6d6d6
| 447297 ||  || — || November 25, 2005 || Kitt Peak || Spacewatch || — || align=right | 3.5 km || 
|-id=298 bgcolor=#fefefe
| 447298 ||  || — || November 25, 2005 || Mount Lemmon || Mount Lemmon Survey || — || align=right data-sort-value="0.64" | 640 m || 
|-id=299 bgcolor=#fefefe
| 447299 ||  || — || November 25, 2005 || Mount Lemmon || Mount Lemmon Survey || — || align=right | 3.0 km || 
|-id=300 bgcolor=#d6d6d6
| 447300 ||  || — || November 28, 2005 || Mount Lemmon || Mount Lemmon Survey || — || align=right | 3.4 km || 
|}

447301–447400 

|-bgcolor=#d6d6d6
| 447301 ||  || — || October 27, 2005 || Anderson Mesa || LONEOS || — || align=right | 2.9 km || 
|-id=302 bgcolor=#fefefe
| 447302 ||  || — || November 28, 2005 || Mount Lemmon || Mount Lemmon Survey || — || align=right data-sort-value="0.92" | 920 m || 
|-id=303 bgcolor=#fefefe
| 447303 ||  || — || November 26, 2005 || Mount Lemmon || Mount Lemmon Survey || — || align=right data-sort-value="0.64" | 640 m || 
|-id=304 bgcolor=#d6d6d6
| 447304 ||  || — || October 29, 2005 || Mount Lemmon || Mount Lemmon Survey || — || align=right | 4.0 km || 
|-id=305 bgcolor=#d6d6d6
| 447305 ||  || — || November 29, 2005 || Kitt Peak || Spacewatch || — || align=right | 2.8 km || 
|-id=306 bgcolor=#fefefe
| 447306 ||  || — || November 1, 2005 || Kitt Peak || Spacewatch || — || align=right data-sort-value="0.67" | 670 m || 
|-id=307 bgcolor=#d6d6d6
| 447307 ||  || — || October 28, 2005 || Mount Lemmon || Mount Lemmon Survey || — || align=right | 2.1 km || 
|-id=308 bgcolor=#fefefe
| 447308 ||  || — || October 30, 2005 || Mount Lemmon || Mount Lemmon Survey || — || align=right data-sort-value="0.82" | 820 m || 
|-id=309 bgcolor=#d6d6d6
| 447309 ||  || — || October 29, 2005 || Mount Lemmon || Mount Lemmon Survey || — || align=right | 3.9 km || 
|-id=310 bgcolor=#d6d6d6
| 447310 ||  || — || November 1, 2005 || Mount Lemmon || Mount Lemmon Survey || — || align=right | 2.4 km || 
|-id=311 bgcolor=#d6d6d6
| 447311 ||  || — || November 30, 2005 || Kitt Peak || Spacewatch || — || align=right | 2.4 km || 
|-id=312 bgcolor=#fefefe
| 447312 ||  || — || November 30, 2005 || Kitt Peak || Spacewatch || — || align=right data-sort-value="0.57" | 570 m || 
|-id=313 bgcolor=#fefefe
| 447313 ||  || — || November 30, 2005 || Socorro || LINEAR || (2076) || align=right data-sort-value="0.87" | 870 m || 
|-id=314 bgcolor=#d6d6d6
| 447314 ||  || — || December 1, 2005 || Palomar || NEAT || — || align=right | 4.1 km || 
|-id=315 bgcolor=#fefefe
| 447315 ||  || — || October 30, 2005 || Mount Lemmon || Mount Lemmon Survey || — || align=right data-sort-value="0.76" | 760 m || 
|-id=316 bgcolor=#d6d6d6
| 447316 ||  || — || December 1, 2005 || Mount Lemmon || Mount Lemmon Survey || HYG || align=right | 2.8 km || 
|-id=317 bgcolor=#d6d6d6
| 447317 ||  || — || December 2, 2005 || Mount Lemmon || Mount Lemmon Survey || URS || align=right | 3.2 km || 
|-id=318 bgcolor=#d6d6d6
| 447318 ||  || — || December 2, 2005 || Mount Lemmon || Mount Lemmon Survey || — || align=right | 2.9 km || 
|-id=319 bgcolor=#d6d6d6
| 447319 ||  || — || December 2, 2005 || Kitt Peak || Spacewatch || — || align=right | 2.6 km || 
|-id=320 bgcolor=#fefefe
| 447320 ||  || — || December 2, 2005 || Kitt Peak || Spacewatch || — || align=right data-sort-value="0.71" | 710 m || 
|-id=321 bgcolor=#d6d6d6
| 447321 ||  || — || November 22, 2005 || Kitt Peak || Spacewatch || — || align=right | 3.3 km || 
|-id=322 bgcolor=#d6d6d6
| 447322 ||  || — || October 24, 2005 || Kitt Peak || Spacewatch || — || align=right | 2.5 km || 
|-id=323 bgcolor=#fefefe
| 447323 ||  || — || December 2, 2005 || Kitt Peak || Spacewatch || — || align=right data-sort-value="0.89" | 890 m || 
|-id=324 bgcolor=#d6d6d6
| 447324 ||  || — || November 28, 2005 || Catalina || CSS || — || align=right | 3.2 km || 
|-id=325 bgcolor=#d6d6d6
| 447325 ||  || — || December 1, 2005 || Kitt Peak || M. W. Buie || — || align=right | 2.6 km || 
|-id=326 bgcolor=#d6d6d6
| 447326 ||  || — || December 21, 2005 || Catalina || CSS || — || align=right | 2.9 km || 
|-id=327 bgcolor=#FA8072
| 447327 ||  || — || December 22, 2005 || Kitt Peak || Spacewatch || H || align=right data-sort-value="0.80" | 800 m || 
|-id=328 bgcolor=#d6d6d6
| 447328 ||  || — || December 22, 2005 || Kitt Peak || Spacewatch || — || align=right | 3.1 km || 
|-id=329 bgcolor=#d6d6d6
| 447329 ||  || — || December 24, 2005 || Kitt Peak || Spacewatch || — || align=right | 2.4 km || 
|-id=330 bgcolor=#d6d6d6
| 447330 ||  || — || December 24, 2005 || Kitt Peak || Spacewatch || — || align=right | 2.3 km || 
|-id=331 bgcolor=#d6d6d6
| 447331 ||  || — || December 24, 2005 || Kitt Peak || Spacewatch || — || align=right | 3.8 km || 
|-id=332 bgcolor=#d6d6d6
| 447332 ||  || — || December 22, 2005 || Kitt Peak || Spacewatch || — || align=right | 2.7 km || 
|-id=333 bgcolor=#fefefe
| 447333 ||  || — || December 25, 2005 || Kitt Peak || Spacewatch || MAS || align=right data-sort-value="0.65" | 650 m || 
|-id=334 bgcolor=#FA8072
| 447334 ||  || — || December 25, 2005 || Kitt Peak || Spacewatch || — || align=right data-sort-value="0.68" | 680 m || 
|-id=335 bgcolor=#FA8072
| 447335 ||  || — || December 24, 2005 || Socorro || LINEAR || — || align=right | 1.3 km || 
|-id=336 bgcolor=#fefefe
| 447336 ||  || — || December 26, 2005 || Kitt Peak || Spacewatch || — || align=right data-sort-value="0.82" | 820 m || 
|-id=337 bgcolor=#fefefe
| 447337 ||  || — || December 24, 2005 || Kitt Peak || Spacewatch || — || align=right data-sort-value="0.68" | 680 m || 
|-id=338 bgcolor=#d6d6d6
| 447338 ||  || — || December 25, 2005 || Mount Lemmon || Mount Lemmon Survey || — || align=right | 2.3 km || 
|-id=339 bgcolor=#d6d6d6
| 447339 ||  || — || December 25, 2005 || Kitt Peak || Spacewatch || — || align=right | 3.8 km || 
|-id=340 bgcolor=#fefefe
| 447340 ||  || — || December 25, 2005 || Kitt Peak || Spacewatch || — || align=right | 1.0 km || 
|-id=341 bgcolor=#fefefe
| 447341 ||  || — || December 26, 2005 || Kitt Peak || Spacewatch || — || align=right data-sort-value="0.81" | 810 m || 
|-id=342 bgcolor=#fefefe
| 447342 ||  || — || December 25, 2005 || Kitt Peak || Spacewatch || — || align=right data-sort-value="0.94" | 940 m || 
|-id=343 bgcolor=#d6d6d6
| 447343 ||  || — || December 25, 2005 || Kitt Peak || Spacewatch || VER || align=right | 2.7 km || 
|-id=344 bgcolor=#fefefe
| 447344 ||  || — || December 25, 2005 || Kitt Peak || Spacewatch || — || align=right data-sort-value="0.78" | 780 m || 
|-id=345 bgcolor=#d6d6d6
| 447345 ||  || — || December 25, 2005 || Kitt Peak || Spacewatch || — || align=right | 2.1 km || 
|-id=346 bgcolor=#fefefe
| 447346 ||  || — || November 30, 2005 || Kitt Peak || Spacewatch || — || align=right data-sort-value="0.60" | 600 m || 
|-id=347 bgcolor=#d6d6d6
| 447347 ||  || — || December 22, 2005 || Catalina || CSS || — || align=right | 3.4 km || 
|-id=348 bgcolor=#fefefe
| 447348 ||  || — || December 28, 2005 || Mount Lemmon || Mount Lemmon Survey || — || align=right data-sort-value="0.57" | 570 m || 
|-id=349 bgcolor=#d6d6d6
| 447349 ||  || — || October 30, 2005 || Mount Lemmon || Mount Lemmon Survey || — || align=right | 2.7 km || 
|-id=350 bgcolor=#fefefe
| 447350 ||  || — || December 30, 2005 || Kitt Peak || Spacewatch || NYS || align=right data-sort-value="0.57" | 570 m || 
|-id=351 bgcolor=#d6d6d6
| 447351 ||  || — || December 6, 2005 || Kitt Peak || Spacewatch || — || align=right | 4.0 km || 
|-id=352 bgcolor=#fefefe
| 447352 ||  || — || December 25, 2005 || Kitt Peak || Spacewatch || — || align=right data-sort-value="0.89" | 890 m || 
|-id=353 bgcolor=#d6d6d6
| 447353 ||  || — || December 28, 2005 || Mount Lemmon || Mount Lemmon Survey || THM || align=right | 2.0 km || 
|-id=354 bgcolor=#d6d6d6
| 447354 ||  || — || December 29, 2005 || Kitt Peak || Spacewatch || — || align=right | 2.2 km || 
|-id=355 bgcolor=#fefefe
| 447355 ||  || — || December 30, 2005 || Kitt Peak || Spacewatch || — || align=right data-sort-value="0.46" | 460 m || 
|-id=356 bgcolor=#fefefe
| 447356 ||  || — || December 30, 2005 || Mount Lemmon || Mount Lemmon Survey || — || align=right data-sort-value="0.79" | 790 m || 
|-id=357 bgcolor=#d6d6d6
| 447357 ||  || — || November 26, 2005 || Mount Lemmon || Mount Lemmon Survey || — || align=right | 2.6 km || 
|-id=358 bgcolor=#d6d6d6
| 447358 ||  || — || December 24, 2005 || Kitt Peak || Spacewatch || — || align=right | 4.2 km || 
|-id=359 bgcolor=#d6d6d6
| 447359 ||  || — || December 25, 2005 || Mount Lemmon || Mount Lemmon Survey || — || align=right | 3.5 km || 
|-id=360 bgcolor=#d6d6d6
| 447360 ||  || — || December 30, 2005 || Mount Lemmon || Mount Lemmon Survey || — || align=right | 4.8 km || 
|-id=361 bgcolor=#fefefe
| 447361 ||  || — || December 25, 2005 || Kitt Peak || Spacewatch || — || align=right data-sort-value="0.82" | 820 m || 
|-id=362 bgcolor=#d6d6d6
| 447362 ||  || — || January 6, 2006 || Socorro || LINEAR || Tj (2.96) || align=right | 4.8 km || 
|-id=363 bgcolor=#d6d6d6
| 447363 ||  || — || January 5, 2006 || Mount Lemmon || Mount Lemmon Survey || — || align=right | 3.2 km || 
|-id=364 bgcolor=#d6d6d6
| 447364 ||  || — || September 30, 2005 || Mount Lemmon || Mount Lemmon Survey || — || align=right | 4.7 km || 
|-id=365 bgcolor=#d6d6d6
| 447365 ||  || — || December 22, 2005 || Kitt Peak || Spacewatch || — || align=right | 3.7 km || 
|-id=366 bgcolor=#d6d6d6
| 447366 ||  || — || December 26, 2005 || Mount Lemmon || Mount Lemmon Survey || — || align=right | 2.1 km || 
|-id=367 bgcolor=#d6d6d6
| 447367 ||  || — || January 6, 2006 || Catalina || CSS || — || align=right | 4.9 km || 
|-id=368 bgcolor=#fefefe
| 447368 ||  || — || December 22, 2005 || Kitt Peak || Spacewatch || — || align=right data-sort-value="0.98" | 980 m || 
|-id=369 bgcolor=#d6d6d6
| 447369 ||  || — || January 7, 2006 || Mount Lemmon || Mount Lemmon Survey || THM || align=right | 2.2 km || 
|-id=370 bgcolor=#d6d6d6
| 447370 ||  || — || December 24, 2005 || Kitt Peak || Spacewatch || — || align=right | 3.1 km || 
|-id=371 bgcolor=#d6d6d6
| 447371 ||  || — || November 12, 2005 || Kitt Peak || Spacewatch || — || align=right | 2.5 km || 
|-id=372 bgcolor=#d6d6d6
| 447372 ||  || — || January 8, 2006 || Mount Lemmon || Mount Lemmon Survey || — || align=right | 4.3 km || 
|-id=373 bgcolor=#d6d6d6
| 447373 ||  || — || November 25, 2005 || Mount Lemmon || Mount Lemmon Survey || EOS || align=right | 2.1 km || 
|-id=374 bgcolor=#fefefe
| 447374 ||  || — || January 5, 2006 || Kitt Peak || Spacewatch || NYS || align=right data-sort-value="0.59" | 590 m || 
|-id=375 bgcolor=#fefefe
| 447375 ||  || — || January 6, 2006 || Mount Lemmon || Mount Lemmon Survey || — || align=right data-sort-value="0.79" | 790 m || 
|-id=376 bgcolor=#fefefe
| 447376 ||  || — || January 7, 2006 || Mount Lemmon || Mount Lemmon Survey || — || align=right data-sort-value="0.78" | 780 m || 
|-id=377 bgcolor=#d6d6d6
| 447377 ||  || — || January 9, 2006 || Kitt Peak || Spacewatch || EOS || align=right | 2.1 km || 
|-id=378 bgcolor=#d6d6d6
| 447378 ||  || — || January 6, 2006 || Anderson Mesa || LONEOS || — || align=right | 3.1 km || 
|-id=379 bgcolor=#d6d6d6
| 447379 ||  || — || January 7, 2006 || Socorro || LINEAR || — || align=right | 4.1 km || 
|-id=380 bgcolor=#d6d6d6
| 447380 ||  || — || January 5, 2006 || Mount Lemmon || Mount Lemmon Survey || — || align=right | 3.4 km || 
|-id=381 bgcolor=#fefefe
| 447381 ||  || — || January 9, 2006 || Kitt Peak || Spacewatch || — || align=right data-sort-value="0.51" | 510 m || 
|-id=382 bgcolor=#fefefe
| 447382 ||  || — || January 20, 2006 || Kitt Peak || Spacewatch || — || align=right data-sort-value="0.86" | 860 m || 
|-id=383 bgcolor=#d6d6d6
| 447383 ||  || — || November 26, 2005 || Mount Lemmon || Mount Lemmon Survey || — || align=right | 3.8 km || 
|-id=384 bgcolor=#d6d6d6
| 447384 ||  || — || January 22, 2006 || Mount Lemmon || Mount Lemmon Survey || HYG || align=right | 2.9 km || 
|-id=385 bgcolor=#d6d6d6
| 447385 ||  || — || November 4, 2005 || Kitt Peak || Spacewatch || — || align=right | 3.6 km || 
|-id=386 bgcolor=#d6d6d6
| 447386 ||  || — || January 20, 2006 || Kitt Peak || Spacewatch || — || align=right | 2.9 km || 
|-id=387 bgcolor=#fefefe
| 447387 ||  || — || January 6, 2006 || Catalina || CSS || — || align=right | 1.2 km || 
|-id=388 bgcolor=#fefefe
| 447388 ||  || — || January 25, 2006 || Kitt Peak || Spacewatch || — || align=right data-sort-value="0.69" | 690 m || 
|-id=389 bgcolor=#fefefe
| 447389 ||  || — || January 25, 2006 || Kitt Peak || Spacewatch || — || align=right data-sort-value="0.81" | 810 m || 
|-id=390 bgcolor=#d6d6d6
| 447390 ||  || — || January 22, 2006 || Catalina || CSS || — || align=right | 2.8 km || 
|-id=391 bgcolor=#d6d6d6
| 447391 ||  || — || January 23, 2006 || Kitt Peak || Spacewatch || — || align=right | 3.3 km || 
|-id=392 bgcolor=#d6d6d6
| 447392 ||  || — || January 23, 2006 || Kitt Peak || Spacewatch || — || align=right | 2.4 km || 
|-id=393 bgcolor=#d6d6d6
| 447393 ||  || — || January 23, 2006 || Kitt Peak || Spacewatch || — || align=right | 3.1 km || 
|-id=394 bgcolor=#fefefe
| 447394 ||  || — || January 23, 2006 || Kitt Peak || Spacewatch || — || align=right data-sort-value="0.55" | 550 m || 
|-id=395 bgcolor=#d6d6d6
| 447395 ||  || — || January 25, 2006 || Kitt Peak || Spacewatch || — || align=right | 2.1 km || 
|-id=396 bgcolor=#d6d6d6
| 447396 ||  || — || January 25, 2006 || Kitt Peak || Spacewatch || — || align=right | 2.5 km || 
|-id=397 bgcolor=#fefefe
| 447397 ||  || — || January 25, 2006 || Kitt Peak || Spacewatch || — || align=right data-sort-value="0.71" | 710 m || 
|-id=398 bgcolor=#fefefe
| 447398 ||  || — || January 26, 2006 || Kitt Peak || Spacewatch || — || align=right data-sort-value="0.64" | 640 m || 
|-id=399 bgcolor=#fefefe
| 447399 ||  || — || January 26, 2006 || Kitt Peak || Spacewatch || — || align=right data-sort-value="0.71" | 710 m || 
|-id=400 bgcolor=#d6d6d6
| 447400 ||  || — || January 26, 2006 || Kitt Peak || Spacewatch || THM || align=right | 2.0 km || 
|}

447401–447500 

|-bgcolor=#fefefe
| 447401 ||  || — || January 26, 2006 || Mount Lemmon || Mount Lemmon Survey || — || align=right data-sort-value="0.75" | 750 m || 
|-id=402 bgcolor=#fefefe
| 447402 ||  || — || January 26, 2006 || Mount Lemmon || Mount Lemmon Survey || — || align=right | 1.0 km || 
|-id=403 bgcolor=#fefefe
| 447403 ||  || — || January 28, 2006 || Mount Lemmon || Mount Lemmon Survey || — || align=right data-sort-value="0.98" | 980 m || 
|-id=404 bgcolor=#fefefe
| 447404 ||  || — || January 23, 2006 || Catalina || CSS || — || align=right data-sort-value="0.67" | 670 m || 
|-id=405 bgcolor=#fefefe
| 447405 ||  || — || January 29, 1995 || Kitt Peak || Spacewatch || — || align=right data-sort-value="0.72" | 720 m || 
|-id=406 bgcolor=#fefefe
| 447406 ||  || — || January 26, 2006 || Catalina || CSS || — || align=right data-sort-value="0.90" | 900 m || 
|-id=407 bgcolor=#d6d6d6
| 447407 ||  || — || January 5, 2006 || Mount Lemmon || Mount Lemmon Survey || THM || align=right | 2.0 km || 
|-id=408 bgcolor=#fefefe
| 447408 ||  || — || January 26, 2006 || Catalina || CSS || H || align=right data-sort-value="0.88" | 880 m || 
|-id=409 bgcolor=#d6d6d6
| 447409 ||  || — || December 30, 2005 || Kitt Peak || Spacewatch || — || align=right | 2.6 km || 
|-id=410 bgcolor=#d6d6d6
| 447410 ||  || — || January 27, 2006 || Kitt Peak || Spacewatch || VER || align=right | 2.5 km || 
|-id=411 bgcolor=#d6d6d6
| 447411 ||  || — || January 5, 2006 || Mount Lemmon || Mount Lemmon Survey || — || align=right | 3.5 km || 
|-id=412 bgcolor=#d6d6d6
| 447412 ||  || — || January 30, 2006 || Kitt Peak || Spacewatch || Tj (2.97) || align=right | 3.3 km || 
|-id=413 bgcolor=#fefefe
| 447413 ||  || — || December 25, 2005 || Mount Lemmon || Mount Lemmon Survey || (2076) || align=right data-sort-value="0.69" | 690 m || 
|-id=414 bgcolor=#d6d6d6
| 447414 ||  || — || January 9, 2006 || Kitt Peak || Spacewatch || — || align=right | 2.5 km || 
|-id=415 bgcolor=#fefefe
| 447415 ||  || — || January 31, 2006 || Catalina || CSS || H || align=right data-sort-value="0.71" | 710 m || 
|-id=416 bgcolor=#fefefe
| 447416 ||  || — || January 23, 2006 || Kitt Peak || Spacewatch || NYS || align=right data-sort-value="0.66" | 660 m || 
|-id=417 bgcolor=#d6d6d6
| 447417 ||  || — || January 31, 2006 || Mount Lemmon || Mount Lemmon Survey || — || align=right | 1.9 km || 
|-id=418 bgcolor=#fefefe
| 447418 ||  || — || January 23, 2006 || Kitt Peak || Spacewatch || — || align=right data-sort-value="0.67" | 670 m || 
|-id=419 bgcolor=#fefefe
| 447419 ||  || — || January 31, 2006 || Kitt Peak || Spacewatch || — || align=right data-sort-value="0.81" | 810 m || 
|-id=420 bgcolor=#d6d6d6
| 447420 ||  || — || January 26, 2006 || Kitt Peak || Spacewatch || — || align=right | 3.1 km || 
|-id=421 bgcolor=#d6d6d6
| 447421 ||  || — || January 23, 2006 || Kitt Peak || Spacewatch || EOS || align=right | 1.7 km || 
|-id=422 bgcolor=#fefefe
| 447422 ||  || — || February 2, 2006 || Kitt Peak || Spacewatch || — || align=right data-sort-value="0.62" | 620 m || 
|-id=423 bgcolor=#d6d6d6
| 447423 ||  || — || January 7, 2006 || Mount Lemmon || Mount Lemmon Survey || — || align=right | 2.1 km || 
|-id=424 bgcolor=#fefefe
| 447424 ||  || — || February 3, 2006 || Kitt Peak || Spacewatch || — || align=right data-sort-value="0.77" | 770 m || 
|-id=425 bgcolor=#fefefe
| 447425 ||  || — || January 23, 2006 || Mount Lemmon || Mount Lemmon Survey || — || align=right data-sort-value="0.47" | 470 m || 
|-id=426 bgcolor=#d6d6d6
| 447426 ||  || — || February 6, 2006 || Mount Lemmon || Mount Lemmon Survey || — || align=right | 1.8 km || 
|-id=427 bgcolor=#d6d6d6
| 447427 ||  || — || February 7, 2006 || Socorro || LINEAR || — || align=right | 6.6 km || 
|-id=428 bgcolor=#d6d6d6
| 447428 ||  || — || February 17, 2006 || Great Shefford || P. Birtwhistle || — || align=right | 2.5 km || 
|-id=429 bgcolor=#fefefe
| 447429 ||  || — || January 23, 2006 || Kitt Peak || Spacewatch || NYS || align=right data-sort-value="0.65" | 650 m || 
|-id=430 bgcolor=#fefefe
| 447430 ||  || — || February 20, 2006 || Mount Lemmon || Mount Lemmon Survey || — || align=right data-sort-value="0.77" | 770 m || 
|-id=431 bgcolor=#fefefe
| 447431 ||  || — || February 20, 2006 || Kitt Peak || Spacewatch || — || align=right data-sort-value="0.57" | 570 m || 
|-id=432 bgcolor=#fefefe
| 447432 ||  || — || February 25, 2006 || Mount Lemmon || Mount Lemmon Survey || — || align=right data-sort-value="0.63" | 630 m || 
|-id=433 bgcolor=#d6d6d6
| 447433 ||  || — || February 27, 2006 || Catalina || CSS || — || align=right | 4.5 km || 
|-id=434 bgcolor=#E9E9E9
| 447434 ||  || — || February 25, 2006 || Kitt Peak || Spacewatch || — || align=right data-sort-value="0.90" | 900 m || 
|-id=435 bgcolor=#fefefe
| 447435 ||  || — || February 27, 2006 || Mount Lemmon || Mount Lemmon Survey || — || align=right data-sort-value="0.56" | 560 m || 
|-id=436 bgcolor=#fefefe
| 447436 ||  || — || February 27, 2006 || Mount Lemmon || Mount Lemmon Survey || — || align=right data-sort-value="0.65" | 650 m || 
|-id=437 bgcolor=#d6d6d6
| 447437 ||  || — || February 27, 2006 || Mount Lemmon || Mount Lemmon Survey || — || align=right | 3.0 km || 
|-id=438 bgcolor=#fefefe
| 447438 ||  || — || February 27, 2006 || Kitt Peak || Spacewatch || — || align=right | 1.1 km || 
|-id=439 bgcolor=#d6d6d6
| 447439 ||  || — || February 27, 2006 || Catalina || CSS || — || align=right | 2.8 km || 
|-id=440 bgcolor=#fefefe
| 447440 ||  || — || February 20, 2006 || Kitt Peak || Spacewatch || MAS || align=right data-sort-value="0.63" | 630 m || 
|-id=441 bgcolor=#fefefe
| 447441 ||  || — || February 27, 2006 || Catalina || CSS || — || align=right | 1.4 km || 
|-id=442 bgcolor=#fefefe
| 447442 ||  || — || February 21, 2006 || Mount Lemmon || Mount Lemmon Survey || NYS || align=right data-sort-value="0.74" | 740 m || 
|-id=443 bgcolor=#fefefe
| 447443 ||  || — || March 2, 2006 || Kitt Peak || Spacewatch || H || align=right data-sort-value="0.76" | 760 m || 
|-id=444 bgcolor=#fefefe
| 447444 ||  || — || March 2, 2006 || Kitt Peak || Spacewatch || — || align=right data-sort-value="0.71" | 710 m || 
|-id=445 bgcolor=#fefefe
| 447445 ||  || — || January 26, 2006 || Mount Lemmon || Mount Lemmon Survey || NYS || align=right data-sort-value="0.60" | 600 m || 
|-id=446 bgcolor=#fefefe
| 447446 ||  || — || March 3, 2006 || Mount Lemmon || Mount Lemmon Survey || — || align=right data-sort-value="0.71" | 710 m || 
|-id=447 bgcolor=#d6d6d6
| 447447 ||  || — || February 24, 2006 || Kitt Peak || Spacewatch || — || align=right | 3.1 km || 
|-id=448 bgcolor=#fefefe
| 447448 ||  || — || March 3, 2006 || Mount Lemmon || Mount Lemmon Survey || NYS || align=right data-sort-value="0.49" | 490 m || 
|-id=449 bgcolor=#d6d6d6
| 447449 ||  || — || March 9, 2006 || Kitt Peak || Spacewatch || — || align=right | 2.7 km || 
|-id=450 bgcolor=#fefefe
| 447450 ||  || — || March 24, 2006 || Mount Lemmon || Mount Lemmon Survey || — || align=right data-sort-value="0.79" | 790 m || 
|-id=451 bgcolor=#d6d6d6
| 447451 ||  || — || April 2, 2006 || Mount Lemmon || Mount Lemmon Survey || — || align=right | 3.1 km || 
|-id=452 bgcolor=#fefefe
| 447452 ||  || — || April 6, 2006 || Kitt Peak || Spacewatch || — || align=right data-sort-value="0.82" | 820 m || 
|-id=453 bgcolor=#fefefe
| 447453 ||  || — || April 19, 2006 || Mount Lemmon || Mount Lemmon Survey || H || align=right data-sort-value="0.87" | 870 m || 
|-id=454 bgcolor=#fefefe
| 447454 ||  || — || April 24, 2006 || Kitt Peak || Spacewatch || H || align=right data-sort-value="0.49" | 490 m || 
|-id=455 bgcolor=#fefefe
| 447455 ||  || — || April 30, 2006 || Kitt Peak || Spacewatch || — || align=right data-sort-value="0.98" | 980 m || 
|-id=456 bgcolor=#fefefe
| 447456 ||  || — || April 24, 2006 || Kitt Peak || Spacewatch || — || align=right | 1.1 km || 
|-id=457 bgcolor=#E9E9E9
| 447457 ||  || — || May 2, 2006 || Kitt Peak || Spacewatch || — || align=right data-sort-value="0.98" | 980 m || 
|-id=458 bgcolor=#d6d6d6
| 447458 ||  || — || May 3, 2006 || Kitt Peak || Spacewatch || THB || align=right | 4.2 km || 
|-id=459 bgcolor=#fefefe
| 447459 ||  || — || May 6, 2006 || Kitt Peak || Spacewatch || H || align=right data-sort-value="0.63" | 630 m || 
|-id=460 bgcolor=#fefefe
| 447460 ||  || — || May 9, 2006 || Mount Lemmon || Mount Lemmon Survey || — || align=right | 1.1 km || 
|-id=461 bgcolor=#E9E9E9
| 447461 ||  || — || May 8, 2006 || Mount Lemmon || Mount Lemmon Survey || — || align=right | 1.2 km || 
|-id=462 bgcolor=#E9E9E9
| 447462 ||  || — || May 9, 2006 || Mount Lemmon || Mount Lemmon Survey || ADE || align=right | 1.3 km || 
|-id=463 bgcolor=#E9E9E9
| 447463 ||  || — || June 2, 2006 || Kitt Peak || Spacewatch || EUN || align=right data-sort-value="0.84" | 840 m || 
|-id=464 bgcolor=#E9E9E9
| 447464 || 2006 NU || — || July 1, 2006 || Uccle || E. W. Elst, H. Debehogne || — || align=right | 1.3 km || 
|-id=465 bgcolor=#E9E9E9
| 447465 ||  || — || August 15, 2006 || Palomar || NEAT || ADE || align=right | 2.1 km || 
|-id=466 bgcolor=#E9E9E9
| 447466 ||  || — || August 18, 2006 || Kitt Peak || Spacewatch || — || align=right | 1.5 km || 
|-id=467 bgcolor=#E9E9E9
| 447467 ||  || — || August 19, 2006 || Kitt Peak || Spacewatch || — || align=right | 1.2 km || 
|-id=468 bgcolor=#E9E9E9
| 447468 ||  || — || August 19, 2006 || Kitt Peak || Spacewatch || — || align=right | 1.3 km || 
|-id=469 bgcolor=#E9E9E9
| 447469 ||  || — || August 18, 2006 || Anderson Mesa || LONEOS || — || align=right | 1.5 km || 
|-id=470 bgcolor=#E9E9E9
| 447470 ||  || — || August 16, 2006 || Siding Spring || SSS || — || align=right | 1.5 km || 
|-id=471 bgcolor=#E9E9E9
| 447471 ||  || — || August 16, 2006 || Siding Spring || SSS || — || align=right | 2.0 km || 
|-id=472 bgcolor=#E9E9E9
| 447472 ||  || — || August 21, 2006 || Kitt Peak || Spacewatch || — || align=right | 1.3 km || 
|-id=473 bgcolor=#E9E9E9
| 447473 ||  || — || August 19, 2006 || Kitt Peak || Spacewatch || MRX || align=right | 1.1 km || 
|-id=474 bgcolor=#E9E9E9
| 447474 ||  || — || August 25, 2006 || Lulin Observatory || C.-S. Lin, Q.-z. Ye || — || align=right | 2.0 km || 
|-id=475 bgcolor=#E9E9E9
| 447475 ||  || — || August 27, 2006 || Anderson Mesa || LONEOS || — || align=right | 2.0 km || 
|-id=476 bgcolor=#E9E9E9
| 447476 ||  || — || August 28, 2006 || Catalina || CSS || EUN || align=right | 2.0 km || 
|-id=477 bgcolor=#E9E9E9
| 447477 ||  || — || August 29, 2006 || Catalina || CSS || JUN || align=right | 1.2 km || 
|-id=478 bgcolor=#E9E9E9
| 447478 ||  || — || August 29, 2006 || Anderson Mesa || LONEOS || — || align=right | 1.5 km || 
|-id=479 bgcolor=#E9E9E9
| 447479 ||  || — || August 30, 2006 || Anderson Mesa || LONEOS || — || align=right | 1.8 km || 
|-id=480 bgcolor=#E9E9E9
| 447480 ||  || — || August 18, 2006 || Kitt Peak || Spacewatch || — || align=right | 1.8 km || 
|-id=481 bgcolor=#E9E9E9
| 447481 ||  || — || August 27, 2006 || Kitt Peak || Spacewatch || — || align=right | 1.9 km || 
|-id=482 bgcolor=#E9E9E9
| 447482 ||  || — || August 31, 2006 || Socorro || LINEAR || — || align=right | 2.1 km || 
|-id=483 bgcolor=#E9E9E9
| 447483 ||  || — || September 15, 2006 || Kitt Peak || Spacewatch || — || align=right | 1.6 km || 
|-id=484 bgcolor=#E9E9E9
| 447484 ||  || — || September 15, 2006 || Kitt Peak || Spacewatch || — || align=right | 1.7 km || 
|-id=485 bgcolor=#E9E9E9
| 447485 ||  || — || August 30, 2006 || Anderson Mesa || LONEOS || — || align=right | 2.0 km || 
|-id=486 bgcolor=#E9E9E9
| 447486 ||  || — || September 14, 2006 || Kitt Peak || Spacewatch || — || align=right | 1.9 km || 
|-id=487 bgcolor=#E9E9E9
| 447487 ||  || — || September 14, 2006 || Kitt Peak || Spacewatch || — || align=right | 2.0 km || 
|-id=488 bgcolor=#E9E9E9
| 447488 ||  || — || September 14, 2006 || Kitt Peak || Spacewatch || — || align=right | 1.5 km || 
|-id=489 bgcolor=#E9E9E9
| 447489 ||  || — || September 14, 2006 || Kitt Peak || Spacewatch || — || align=right | 1.6 km || 
|-id=490 bgcolor=#E9E9E9
| 447490 ||  || — || September 14, 2006 || Kitt Peak || Spacewatch || — || align=right | 2.1 km || 
|-id=491 bgcolor=#E9E9E9
| 447491 ||  || — || September 14, 2006 || Kitt Peak || Spacewatch || — || align=right | 1.2 km || 
|-id=492 bgcolor=#E9E9E9
| 447492 ||  || — || September 15, 2006 || Goodricke-Pigott || R. A. Tucker || — || align=right | 2.2 km || 
|-id=493 bgcolor=#E9E9E9
| 447493 ||  || — || September 15, 2006 || Kitt Peak || Spacewatch || — || align=right | 2.5 km || 
|-id=494 bgcolor=#E9E9E9
| 447494 ||  || — || September 15, 2006 || Kitt Peak || Spacewatch || — || align=right | 1.8 km || 
|-id=495 bgcolor=#E9E9E9
| 447495 ||  || — || September 15, 2006 || Kitt Peak || Spacewatch || — || align=right | 1.3 km || 
|-id=496 bgcolor=#E9E9E9
| 447496 ||  || — || September 15, 2006 || Kitt Peak || Spacewatch || — || align=right | 1.6 km || 
|-id=497 bgcolor=#E9E9E9
| 447497 ||  || — || July 22, 2006 || Mount Lemmon || Mount Lemmon Survey || — || align=right | 1.6 km || 
|-id=498 bgcolor=#E9E9E9
| 447498 ||  || — || September 15, 2006 || Kitt Peak || Spacewatch || — || align=right | 1.6 km || 
|-id=499 bgcolor=#E9E9E9
| 447499 ||  || — || September 15, 2006 || Kitt Peak || Spacewatch || — || align=right | 1.8 km || 
|-id=500 bgcolor=#E9E9E9
| 447500 ||  || — || September 15, 2006 || Kitt Peak || Spacewatch || — || align=right | 2.1 km || 
|}

447501–447600 

|-bgcolor=#E9E9E9
| 447501 ||  || — || September 14, 2006 || Catalina || CSS || JUN || align=right data-sort-value="0.95" | 950 m || 
|-id=502 bgcolor=#E9E9E9
| 447502 ||  || — || September 15, 2006 || Kitt Peak || Spacewatch || — || align=right | 1.9 km || 
|-id=503 bgcolor=#E9E9E9
| 447503 ||  || — || September 17, 2006 || Kitt Peak || Spacewatch || — || align=right | 1.8 km || 
|-id=504 bgcolor=#E9E9E9
| 447504 ||  || — || September 17, 2006 || Catalina || CSS || — || align=right | 1.6 km || 
|-id=505 bgcolor=#E9E9E9
| 447505 ||  || — || September 17, 2006 || Catalina || CSS || — || align=right | 1.8 km || 
|-id=506 bgcolor=#E9E9E9
| 447506 ||  || — || September 18, 2006 || Catalina || CSS || — || align=right | 1.6 km || 
|-id=507 bgcolor=#E9E9E9
| 447507 ||  || — || September 19, 2006 || Anderson Mesa || LONEOS || — || align=right | 3.2 km || 
|-id=508 bgcolor=#E9E9E9
| 447508 ||  || — || September 16, 2006 || Catalina || CSS || — || align=right | 2.3 km || 
|-id=509 bgcolor=#E9E9E9
| 447509 ||  || — || September 17, 2006 || Catalina || CSS || JUN || align=right | 1.5 km || 
|-id=510 bgcolor=#E9E9E9
| 447510 ||  || — || September 18, 2006 || Anderson Mesa || LONEOS || — || align=right | 1.4 km || 
|-id=511 bgcolor=#E9E9E9
| 447511 ||  || — || September 18, 2006 || Catalina || CSS || JUN || align=right | 1.5 km || 
|-id=512 bgcolor=#E9E9E9
| 447512 ||  || — || September 19, 2006 || Kitt Peak || Spacewatch || MRX || align=right | 1.1 km || 
|-id=513 bgcolor=#E9E9E9
| 447513 ||  || — || September 16, 2006 || Catalina || CSS || — || align=right | 2.3 km || 
|-id=514 bgcolor=#E9E9E9
| 447514 ||  || — || September 17, 2006 || Catalina || CSS || — || align=right | 2.4 km || 
|-id=515 bgcolor=#E9E9E9
| 447515 ||  || — || September 17, 2006 || Kitt Peak || Spacewatch || — || align=right data-sort-value="0.96" | 960 m || 
|-id=516 bgcolor=#E9E9E9
| 447516 ||  || — || September 18, 2006 || Kitt Peak || Spacewatch || — || align=right | 1.8 km || 
|-id=517 bgcolor=#E9E9E9
| 447517 ||  || — || September 18, 2006 || Kitt Peak || Spacewatch || — || align=right | 1.3 km || 
|-id=518 bgcolor=#E9E9E9
| 447518 ||  || — || July 21, 2006 || Mount Lemmon || Mount Lemmon Survey || JUN || align=right | 1.0 km || 
|-id=519 bgcolor=#E9E9E9
| 447519 ||  || — || August 28, 2006 || Anderson Mesa || LONEOS || — || align=right | 1.6 km || 
|-id=520 bgcolor=#E9E9E9
| 447520 ||  || — || September 18, 2006 || Kitt Peak || Spacewatch || — || align=right | 2.2 km || 
|-id=521 bgcolor=#E9E9E9
| 447521 ||  || — || September 19, 2006 || Catalina || CSS || — || align=right | 2.0 km || 
|-id=522 bgcolor=#E9E9E9
| 447522 ||  || — || August 21, 2006 || Kitt Peak || Spacewatch || WIT || align=right data-sort-value="0.92" | 920 m || 
|-id=523 bgcolor=#E9E9E9
| 447523 ||  || — || August 28, 2006 || Anderson Mesa || LONEOS || — || align=right | 2.0 km || 
|-id=524 bgcolor=#E9E9E9
| 447524 ||  || — || December 31, 2002 || Socorro || LINEAR || — || align=right | 1.5 km || 
|-id=525 bgcolor=#E9E9E9
| 447525 ||  || — || September 17, 2006 || Catalina || CSS || EUN || align=right | 2.3 km || 
|-id=526 bgcolor=#d6d6d6
| 447526 ||  || — || September 21, 2006 || Anderson Mesa || LONEOS || — || align=right | 2.6 km || 
|-id=527 bgcolor=#E9E9E9
| 447527 ||  || — || September 25, 2006 || Anderson Mesa || LONEOS || — || align=right | 2.0 km || 
|-id=528 bgcolor=#E9E9E9
| 447528 ||  || — || September 23, 2006 || Kitt Peak || Spacewatch || — || align=right | 2.0 km || 
|-id=529 bgcolor=#E9E9E9
| 447529 ||  || — || September 25, 2006 || Kitt Peak || Spacewatch || — || align=right | 1.8 km || 
|-id=530 bgcolor=#E9E9E9
| 447530 ||  || — || September 25, 2006 || Kitt Peak || Spacewatch || — || align=right | 1.5 km || 
|-id=531 bgcolor=#E9E9E9
| 447531 ||  || — || September 25, 2006 || Mount Lemmon || Mount Lemmon Survey || — || align=right | 1.4 km || 
|-id=532 bgcolor=#E9E9E9
| 447532 ||  || — || July 21, 2006 || Mount Lemmon || Mount Lemmon Survey || — || align=right | 1.7 km || 
|-id=533 bgcolor=#E9E9E9
| 447533 ||  || — || September 27, 2006 || Mount Lemmon || Mount Lemmon Survey || — || align=right | 2.2 km || 
|-id=534 bgcolor=#E9E9E9
| 447534 ||  || — || September 26, 2006 || Kitt Peak || Spacewatch || — || align=right | 1.8 km || 
|-id=535 bgcolor=#E9E9E9
| 447535 ||  || — || September 26, 2006 || Kitt Peak || Spacewatch || — || align=right | 2.0 km || 
|-id=536 bgcolor=#d6d6d6
| 447536 ||  || — || September 26, 2006 || Kitt Peak || Spacewatch || — || align=right | 2.4 km || 
|-id=537 bgcolor=#E9E9E9
| 447537 ||  || — || September 18, 2006 || Kitt Peak || Spacewatch || — || align=right | 1.9 km || 
|-id=538 bgcolor=#E9E9E9
| 447538 ||  || — || September 18, 2006 || Kitt Peak || Spacewatch || — || align=right | 2.2 km || 
|-id=539 bgcolor=#E9E9E9
| 447539 ||  || — || September 26, 2006 || Kitt Peak || Spacewatch || — || align=right | 1.8 km || 
|-id=540 bgcolor=#E9E9E9
| 447540 ||  || — || September 18, 2006 || Kitt Peak || Spacewatch ||  || align=right | 1.7 km || 
|-id=541 bgcolor=#E9E9E9
| 447541 ||  || — || September 26, 2006 || Kitt Peak || Spacewatch || — || align=right | 1.6 km || 
|-id=542 bgcolor=#E9E9E9
| 447542 ||  || — || September 26, 2006 || Mount Lemmon || Mount Lemmon Survey || — || align=right | 2.0 km || 
|-id=543 bgcolor=#E9E9E9
| 447543 ||  || — || September 26, 2006 || Mount Lemmon || Mount Lemmon Survey || — || align=right | 1.8 km || 
|-id=544 bgcolor=#E9E9E9
| 447544 ||  || — || September 21, 2006 || Anderson Mesa || LONEOS || — || align=right | 2.3 km || 
|-id=545 bgcolor=#E9E9E9
| 447545 ||  || — || September 22, 2006 || Anderson Mesa || LONEOS || — || align=right | 1.8 km || 
|-id=546 bgcolor=#E9E9E9
| 447546 ||  || — || September 26, 2006 || Catalina || CSS || — || align=right | 1.9 km || 
|-id=547 bgcolor=#E9E9E9
| 447547 ||  || — || September 18, 2006 || Kitt Peak || Spacewatch || — || align=right | 1.9 km || 
|-id=548 bgcolor=#E9E9E9
| 447548 ||  || — || September 25, 2006 || Kitt Peak || Spacewatch || — || align=right | 1.5 km || 
|-id=549 bgcolor=#E9E9E9
| 447549 ||  || — || September 26, 2006 || Mount Lemmon || Mount Lemmon Survey || — || align=right | 1.8 km || 
|-id=550 bgcolor=#E9E9E9
| 447550 ||  || — || September 17, 2006 || Kitt Peak || Spacewatch || — || align=right | 2.0 km || 
|-id=551 bgcolor=#E9E9E9
| 447551 ||  || — || March 23, 2004 || Kitt Peak || Spacewatch || — || align=right | 1.5 km || 
|-id=552 bgcolor=#E9E9E9
| 447552 ||  || — || September 27, 2006 || Kitt Peak || Spacewatch || — || align=right | 1.7 km || 
|-id=553 bgcolor=#E9E9E9
| 447553 ||  || — || September 27, 2006 || Kitt Peak || Spacewatch || — || align=right | 1.8 km || 
|-id=554 bgcolor=#E9E9E9
| 447554 ||  || — || September 28, 2006 || Kitt Peak || Spacewatch || — || align=right | 1.7 km || 
|-id=555 bgcolor=#E9E9E9
| 447555 ||  || — || September 30, 2006 || Mount Lemmon || Mount Lemmon Survey || — || align=right | 2.5 km || 
|-id=556 bgcolor=#E9E9E9
| 447556 ||  || — || September 18, 2006 || Apache Point || A. C. Becker || — || align=right | 1.9 km || 
|-id=557 bgcolor=#E9E9E9
| 447557 ||  || — || September 29, 2006 || Apache Point || A. C. Becker || — || align=right | 1.9 km || 
|-id=558 bgcolor=#E9E9E9
| 447558 ||  || — || September 14, 2006 || Kitt Peak || Spacewatch || — || align=right | 2.1 km || 
|-id=559 bgcolor=#E9E9E9
| 447559 ||  || — || September 18, 2006 || Kitt Peak || Spacewatch || — || align=right | 2.1 km || 
|-id=560 bgcolor=#E9E9E9
| 447560 ||  || — || September 18, 2006 || Kitt Peak || Spacewatch || — || align=right | 1.5 km || 
|-id=561 bgcolor=#E9E9E9
| 447561 ||  || — || September 26, 2006 || Catalina || CSS || — || align=right | 1.7 km || 
|-id=562 bgcolor=#FA8072
| 447562 ||  || — || October 2, 2006 || Catalina || CSS || — || align=right data-sort-value="0.66" | 660 m || 
|-id=563 bgcolor=#E9E9E9
| 447563 ||  || — || October 2, 2006 || Mount Lemmon || Mount Lemmon Survey || — || align=right | 2.0 km || 
|-id=564 bgcolor=#E9E9E9
| 447564 ||  || — || October 11, 2006 || Kitt Peak || Spacewatch || — || align=right | 1.6 km || 
|-id=565 bgcolor=#E9E9E9
| 447565 ||  || — || September 28, 2006 || Mount Lemmon || Mount Lemmon Survey || — || align=right | 2.0 km || 
|-id=566 bgcolor=#E9E9E9
| 447566 ||  || — || October 12, 2006 || Kitt Peak || Spacewatch || — || align=right | 2.3 km || 
|-id=567 bgcolor=#E9E9E9
| 447567 ||  || — || October 12, 2006 || Kitt Peak || Spacewatch || — || align=right | 2.1 km || 
|-id=568 bgcolor=#E9E9E9
| 447568 ||  || — || October 12, 2006 || Kitt Peak || Spacewatch || — || align=right | 1.7 km || 
|-id=569 bgcolor=#E9E9E9
| 447569 ||  || — || October 2, 2006 || Mount Lemmon || Mount Lemmon Survey || — || align=right | 2.2 km || 
|-id=570 bgcolor=#E9E9E9
| 447570 ||  || — || September 27, 2006 || Catalina || CSS || GEF || align=right | 1.2 km || 
|-id=571 bgcolor=#E9E9E9
| 447571 ||  || — || September 16, 2006 || Catalina || CSS || — || align=right | 2.1 km || 
|-id=572 bgcolor=#E9E9E9
| 447572 ||  || — || October 11, 2006 || Palomar || NEAT || fast? || align=right | 1.7 km || 
|-id=573 bgcolor=#E9E9E9
| 447573 ||  || — || September 17, 2006 || Kitt Peak || Spacewatch || — || align=right | 2.3 km || 
|-id=574 bgcolor=#E9E9E9
| 447574 ||  || — || October 11, 2006 || Palomar || NEAT || — || align=right | 2.2 km || 
|-id=575 bgcolor=#E9E9E9
| 447575 ||  || — || October 13, 2006 || Kitt Peak || Spacewatch || — || align=right | 2.7 km || 
|-id=576 bgcolor=#E9E9E9
| 447576 ||  || — || October 13, 2006 || Kitt Peak || Spacewatch || AGN || align=right | 1.0 km || 
|-id=577 bgcolor=#E9E9E9
| 447577 ||  || — || September 20, 2006 || Anderson Mesa || LONEOS || — || align=right | 2.3 km || 
|-id=578 bgcolor=#E9E9E9
| 447578 ||  || — || October 15, 2006 || Kitt Peak || Spacewatch || — || align=right | 3.3 km || 
|-id=579 bgcolor=#E9E9E9
| 447579 ||  || — || October 15, 2006 || Kitt Peak || Spacewatch || — || align=right | 1.8 km || 
|-id=580 bgcolor=#E9E9E9
| 447580 ||  || — || October 15, 2006 || Catalina || CSS || NEM || align=right | 2.4 km || 
|-id=581 bgcolor=#E9E9E9
| 447581 ||  || — || October 3, 2006 || Apache Point || A. C. Becker || NEM || align=right | 2.3 km || 
|-id=582 bgcolor=#E9E9E9
| 447582 ||  || — || October 3, 2006 || Apache Point || A. C. Becker || — || align=right | 1.6 km || 
|-id=583 bgcolor=#d6d6d6
| 447583 ||  || — || October 2, 2006 || Mount Lemmon || Mount Lemmon Survey || — || align=right | 2.4 km || 
|-id=584 bgcolor=#d6d6d6
| 447584 ||  || — || October 2, 2006 || Mount Lemmon || Mount Lemmon Survey || 615 || align=right | 1.3 km || 
|-id=585 bgcolor=#E9E9E9
| 447585 ||  || — || October 16, 2006 || Kitt Peak || Spacewatch || — || align=right | 1.9 km || 
|-id=586 bgcolor=#E9E9E9
| 447586 ||  || — || October 16, 2006 || Kitt Peak || Spacewatch || — || align=right | 1.8 km || 
|-id=587 bgcolor=#E9E9E9
| 447587 ||  || — || October 16, 2006 || Kitt Peak || Spacewatch || — || align=right | 1.9 km || 
|-id=588 bgcolor=#E9E9E9
| 447588 ||  || — || October 16, 2006 || Kitt Peak || Spacewatch || HOF || align=right | 2.0 km || 
|-id=589 bgcolor=#E9E9E9
| 447589 ||  || — || October 12, 2006 || Kitt Peak || Spacewatch || — || align=right | 2.1 km || 
|-id=590 bgcolor=#E9E9E9
| 447590 ||  || — || October 16, 2006 || Kitt Peak || Spacewatch || AGN || align=right | 1.3 km || 
|-id=591 bgcolor=#E9E9E9
| 447591 ||  || — || October 16, 2006 || Kitt Peak || Spacewatch || — || align=right | 1.7 km || 
|-id=592 bgcolor=#E9E9E9
| 447592 ||  || — || October 17, 2006 || Mount Lemmon || Mount Lemmon Survey || — || align=right | 2.1 km || 
|-id=593 bgcolor=#E9E9E9
| 447593 ||  || — || October 18, 2006 || Kitt Peak || Spacewatch || — || align=right | 1.7 km || 
|-id=594 bgcolor=#E9E9E9
| 447594 ||  || — || April 16, 2005 || Kitt Peak || Spacewatch || — || align=right | 1.5 km || 
|-id=595 bgcolor=#E9E9E9
| 447595 ||  || — || October 16, 2006 || Catalina || CSS || PAD || align=right | 1.7 km || 
|-id=596 bgcolor=#E9E9E9
| 447596 ||  || — || October 17, 2006 || Kitt Peak || Spacewatch || — || align=right | 1.9 km || 
|-id=597 bgcolor=#E9E9E9
| 447597 ||  || — || September 28, 2006 || Mount Lemmon || Mount Lemmon Survey || — || align=right | 1.9 km || 
|-id=598 bgcolor=#E9E9E9
| 447598 ||  || — || October 17, 2006 || Kitt Peak || Spacewatch || — || align=right | 2.9 km || 
|-id=599 bgcolor=#E9E9E9
| 447599 ||  || — || October 17, 2006 || Mount Lemmon || Mount Lemmon Survey || — || align=right | 1.8 km || 
|-id=600 bgcolor=#E9E9E9
| 447600 ||  || — || October 2, 2006 || Mount Lemmon || Mount Lemmon Survey || — || align=right | 2.4 km || 
|}

447601–447700 

|-bgcolor=#E9E9E9
| 447601 ||  || — || October 19, 2006 || Kitt Peak || Spacewatch || — || align=right | 2.2 km || 
|-id=602 bgcolor=#E9E9E9
| 447602 ||  || — || September 27, 2006 || Catalina || CSS || — || align=right | 1.8 km || 
|-id=603 bgcolor=#E9E9E9
| 447603 ||  || — || September 18, 2006 || Kitt Peak || Spacewatch || EUN || align=right | 1.2 km || 
|-id=604 bgcolor=#E9E9E9
| 447604 ||  || — || September 25, 2006 || Kitt Peak || Spacewatch || — || align=right | 2.1 km || 
|-id=605 bgcolor=#E9E9E9
| 447605 ||  || — || October 19, 2006 || Kitt Peak || Spacewatch ||  || align=right | 1.9 km || 
|-id=606 bgcolor=#E9E9E9
| 447606 ||  || — || October 2, 2006 || Kitt Peak || Spacewatch || — || align=right | 1.9 km || 
|-id=607 bgcolor=#E9E9E9
| 447607 ||  || — || October 19, 2006 || Kitt Peak || Spacewatch || — || align=right | 1.7 km || 
|-id=608 bgcolor=#E9E9E9
| 447608 ||  || — || October 19, 2006 || Kitt Peak || Spacewatch || — || align=right | 1.4 km || 
|-id=609 bgcolor=#E9E9E9
| 447609 ||  || — || September 27, 2006 || Mount Lemmon || Mount Lemmon Survey || — || align=right | 2.1 km || 
|-id=610 bgcolor=#E9E9E9
| 447610 ||  || — || September 30, 2006 || Mount Lemmon || Mount Lemmon Survey || — || align=right | 2.2 km || 
|-id=611 bgcolor=#E9E9E9
| 447611 ||  || — || October 4, 2006 || Mount Lemmon || Mount Lemmon Survey || — || align=right | 2.3 km || 
|-id=612 bgcolor=#E9E9E9
| 447612 ||  || — || October 19, 2006 || Kitt Peak || Spacewatch || DOR || align=right | 1.9 km || 
|-id=613 bgcolor=#E9E9E9
| 447613 ||  || — || October 19, 2006 || Kitt Peak || Spacewatch || — || align=right | 2.3 km || 
|-id=614 bgcolor=#E9E9E9
| 447614 ||  || — || October 4, 2006 || Mount Lemmon || Mount Lemmon Survey || — || align=right | 2.2 km || 
|-id=615 bgcolor=#E9E9E9
| 447615 ||  || — || October 20, 2006 || Kitt Peak || Spacewatch || AST || align=right | 1.6 km || 
|-id=616 bgcolor=#E9E9E9
| 447616 ||  || — || October 2, 2006 || Kitt Peak || Spacewatch || EUN || align=right | 1.1 km || 
|-id=617 bgcolor=#E9E9E9
| 447617 ||  || — || October 2, 2006 || Mount Lemmon || Mount Lemmon Survey || HOF || align=right | 2.4 km || 
|-id=618 bgcolor=#E9E9E9
| 447618 ||  || — || October 21, 2006 || Mount Lemmon || Mount Lemmon Survey || — || align=right | 1.9 km || 
|-id=619 bgcolor=#E9E9E9
| 447619 ||  || — || October 16, 2006 || Catalina || CSS || — || align=right | 1.7 km || 
|-id=620 bgcolor=#E9E9E9
| 447620 ||  || — || September 17, 2006 || Catalina || CSS || JUN || align=right | 1.3 km || 
|-id=621 bgcolor=#E9E9E9
| 447621 ||  || — || October 21, 2006 || Catalina || CSS || EUN || align=right | 1.7 km || 
|-id=622 bgcolor=#d6d6d6
| 447622 ||  || — || October 23, 2006 || Kitt Peak || Spacewatch || BRA || align=right | 1.3 km || 
|-id=623 bgcolor=#E9E9E9
| 447623 ||  || — || October 27, 2006 || Mount Lemmon || Mount Lemmon Survey || — || align=right | 2.1 km || 
|-id=624 bgcolor=#E9E9E9
| 447624 ||  || — || October 2, 2006 || Mount Lemmon || Mount Lemmon Survey || — || align=right | 2.2 km || 
|-id=625 bgcolor=#E9E9E9
| 447625 ||  || — || October 19, 2006 || Catalina || CSS || — || align=right | 1.8 km || 
|-id=626 bgcolor=#E9E9E9
| 447626 ||  || — || October 17, 2006 || Catalina || CSS || — || align=right | 1.9 km || 
|-id=627 bgcolor=#E9E9E9
| 447627 ||  || — || October 27, 2006 || Mount Lemmon || Mount Lemmon Survey || — || align=right | 2.2 km || 
|-id=628 bgcolor=#E9E9E9
| 447628 ||  || — || October 27, 2006 || Mount Lemmon || Mount Lemmon Survey || EUN || align=right | 1.1 km || 
|-id=629 bgcolor=#E9E9E9
| 447629 ||  || — || October 28, 2006 || Mount Lemmon || Mount Lemmon Survey || — || align=right | 2.0 km || 
|-id=630 bgcolor=#E9E9E9
| 447630 ||  || — || September 30, 2006 || Mount Lemmon || Mount Lemmon Survey || — || align=right | 2.0 km || 
|-id=631 bgcolor=#E9E9E9
| 447631 ||  || — || October 27, 2006 || Mount Lemmon || Mount Lemmon Survey || — || align=right | 3.2 km || 
|-id=632 bgcolor=#E9E9E9
| 447632 ||  || — || October 28, 2006 || Mount Lemmon || Mount Lemmon Survey || — || align=right | 1.7 km || 
|-id=633 bgcolor=#E9E9E9
| 447633 ||  || — || October 31, 2006 || Mount Lemmon || Mount Lemmon Survey || — || align=right | 1.3 km || 
|-id=634 bgcolor=#E9E9E9
| 447634 ||  || — || October 21, 2006 || Mount Lemmon || Mount Lemmon Survey || AGN || align=right | 1.0 km || 
|-id=635 bgcolor=#E9E9E9
| 447635 ||  || — || November 9, 2006 || Kitt Peak || Spacewatch || — || align=right | 2.5 km || 
|-id=636 bgcolor=#E9E9E9
| 447636 ||  || — || November 11, 2006 || Catalina || CSS ||  || align=right | 1.9 km || 
|-id=637 bgcolor=#E9E9E9
| 447637 ||  || — || November 9, 2006 || Kitt Peak || Spacewatch || GEF || align=right | 1.2 km || 
|-id=638 bgcolor=#E9E9E9
| 447638 ||  || — || November 9, 2006 || Kitt Peak || Spacewatch || — || align=right | 1.4 km || 
|-id=639 bgcolor=#E9E9E9
| 447639 ||  || — || October 13, 2006 || Kitt Peak || Spacewatch || — || align=right | 1.7 km || 
|-id=640 bgcolor=#fefefe
| 447640 ||  || — || November 10, 2006 || Kitt Peak || Spacewatch || — || align=right | 1.2 km || 
|-id=641 bgcolor=#E9E9E9
| 447641 ||  || — || September 28, 2006 || Mount Lemmon || Mount Lemmon Survey || — || align=right | 2.1 km || 
|-id=642 bgcolor=#E9E9E9
| 447642 ||  || — || October 19, 2006 || Mount Lemmon || Mount Lemmon Survey || — || align=right | 2.2 km || 
|-id=643 bgcolor=#E9E9E9
| 447643 ||  || — || October 22, 2006 || Mount Lemmon || Mount Lemmon Survey || — || align=right | 2.1 km || 
|-id=644 bgcolor=#d6d6d6
| 447644 ||  || — || October 13, 2001 || Kitt Peak || Spacewatch || KORcritical || align=right | 1.2 km || 
|-id=645 bgcolor=#E9E9E9
| 447645 ||  || — || October 21, 2006 || Mount Lemmon || Mount Lemmon Survey || — || align=right | 2.0 km || 
|-id=646 bgcolor=#E9E9E9
| 447646 ||  || — || October 19, 2006 || Mount Lemmon || Mount Lemmon Survey || — || align=right | 2.8 km || 
|-id=647 bgcolor=#E9E9E9
| 447647 ||  || — || November 11, 2006 || Catalina || CSS || — || align=right | 2.5 km || 
|-id=648 bgcolor=#E9E9E9
| 447648 ||  || — || November 11, 2006 || Kitt Peak || Spacewatch || — || align=right | 2.5 km || 
|-id=649 bgcolor=#E9E9E9
| 447649 ||  || — || November 12, 2006 || Mount Lemmon || Mount Lemmon Survey || AGN || align=right | 1.2 km || 
|-id=650 bgcolor=#E9E9E9
| 447650 ||  || — || November 13, 2006 || Kitt Peak || Spacewatch || — || align=right | 2.5 km || 
|-id=651 bgcolor=#E9E9E9
| 447651 ||  || — || November 14, 2006 || Kitt Peak || Spacewatch || — || align=right | 1.7 km || 
|-id=652 bgcolor=#E9E9E9
| 447652 ||  || — || November 15, 2006 || Kitt Peak || Spacewatch || AGN || align=right | 1.2 km || 
|-id=653 bgcolor=#E9E9E9
| 447653 ||  || — || October 31, 2006 || Mount Lemmon || Mount Lemmon Survey || — || align=right | 1.6 km || 
|-id=654 bgcolor=#E9E9E9
| 447654 ||  || — || October 16, 2006 || Catalina || CSS || — || align=right | 2.7 km || 
|-id=655 bgcolor=#FFC2E0
| 447655 ||  || — || November 16, 2006 || Kitt Peak || Spacewatch || AMOcritical || align=right data-sort-value="0.37" | 370 m || 
|-id=656 bgcolor=#E9E9E9
| 447656 ||  || — || November 16, 2006 || Kitt Peak || Spacewatch || — || align=right | 2.5 km || 
|-id=657 bgcolor=#E9E9E9
| 447657 ||  || — || September 19, 2006 || Catalina || CSS || — || align=right | 2.8 km || 
|-id=658 bgcolor=#E9E9E9
| 447658 ||  || — || November 17, 2006 || Kitt Peak || Spacewatch || DOR || align=right | 2.0 km || 
|-id=659 bgcolor=#E9E9E9
| 447659 ||  || — || November 17, 2006 || Mount Lemmon || Mount Lemmon Survey || AGN || align=right data-sort-value="0.98" | 980 m || 
|-id=660 bgcolor=#E9E9E9
| 447660 ||  || — || October 23, 2006 || Mount Lemmon || Mount Lemmon Survey || AGN || align=right | 1.1 km || 
|-id=661 bgcolor=#E9E9E9
| 447661 ||  || — || October 20, 2006 || Catalina || CSS || — || align=right | 3.3 km || 
|-id=662 bgcolor=#E9E9E9
| 447662 ||  || — || September 30, 2006 || Kitt Peak || Spacewatch || — || align=right | 2.6 km || 
|-id=663 bgcolor=#d6d6d6
| 447663 ||  || — || September 27, 2006 || Mount Lemmon || Mount Lemmon Survey || EOS || align=right | 2.2 km || 
|-id=664 bgcolor=#E9E9E9
| 447664 ||  || — || November 19, 2006 || Kitt Peak || Spacewatch || — || align=right | 2.1 km || 
|-id=665 bgcolor=#E9E9E9
| 447665 ||  || — || November 19, 2006 || Kitt Peak || Spacewatch || — || align=right | 1.5 km || 
|-id=666 bgcolor=#d6d6d6
| 447666 ||  || — || November 23, 2006 || Kitt Peak || Spacewatch || KOR || align=right | 1.1 km || 
|-id=667 bgcolor=#E9E9E9
| 447667 ||  || — || October 13, 2006 || Kitt Peak || Spacewatch || PAD || align=right | 1.5 km || 
|-id=668 bgcolor=#d6d6d6
| 447668 ||  || — || November 19, 2006 || Kitt Peak || Spacewatch || — || align=right | 2.2 km || 
|-id=669 bgcolor=#E9E9E9
| 447669 ||  || — || November 27, 2006 || Kitt Peak || Spacewatch || — || align=right | 1.8 km || 
|-id=670 bgcolor=#d6d6d6
| 447670 ||  || — || December 1, 2006 || Mount Lemmon || Mount Lemmon Survey || — || align=right | 2.5 km || 
|-id=671 bgcolor=#E9E9E9
| 447671 ||  || — || December 10, 2006 || Kitt Peak || Spacewatch || — || align=right | 2.4 km || 
|-id=672 bgcolor=#E9E9E9
| 447672 ||  || — || October 22, 2006 || Catalina || CSS || — || align=right | 2.7 km || 
|-id=673 bgcolor=#E9E9E9
| 447673 ||  || — || December 12, 2006 || Kitt Peak || Spacewatch || — || align=right | 1.8 km || 
|-id=674 bgcolor=#E9E9E9
| 447674 ||  || — || November 25, 2006 || Kitt Peak || Spacewatch ||  || align=right | 1.9 km || 
|-id=675 bgcolor=#E9E9E9
| 447675 ||  || — || November 13, 2006 || Catalina || CSS || — || align=right | 1.8 km || 
|-id=676 bgcolor=#d6d6d6
| 447676 ||  || — || December 13, 2006 || Kitt Peak || Spacewatch || — || align=right | 3.0 km || 
|-id=677 bgcolor=#d6d6d6
| 447677 ||  || — || December 21, 2006 || Kitt Peak || Spacewatch || — || align=right | 2.9 km || 
|-id=678 bgcolor=#d6d6d6
| 447678 ||  || — || November 18, 2006 || Mount Lemmon || Mount Lemmon Survey || — || align=right | 2.4 km || 
|-id=679 bgcolor=#d6d6d6
| 447679 ||  || — || November 27, 2006 || Mount Lemmon || Mount Lemmon Survey || EOS || align=right | 1.7 km || 
|-id=680 bgcolor=#fefefe
| 447680 ||  || — || December 21, 2006 || Kitt Peak || Spacewatch || — || align=right data-sort-value="0.59" | 590 m || 
|-id=681 bgcolor=#d6d6d6
| 447681 ||  || — || December 21, 2006 || Kitt Peak || Spacewatch || EOS || align=right | 1.8 km || 
|-id=682 bgcolor=#d6d6d6
| 447682 Rambaldi ||  ||  || January 15, 2007 || Vallemare di Borbona || V. S. Casulli || EOS || align=right | 1.7 km || 
|-id=683 bgcolor=#d6d6d6
| 447683 ||  || — || December 13, 2006 || Mount Lemmon || Mount Lemmon Survey || — || align=right | 2.5 km || 
|-id=684 bgcolor=#fefefe
| 447684 ||  || — || January 17, 2007 || Kitt Peak || Spacewatch || — || align=right data-sort-value="0.60" | 600 m || 
|-id=685 bgcolor=#d6d6d6
| 447685 ||  || — || January 17, 2007 || Kitt Peak || Spacewatch || — || align=right | 2.4 km || 
|-id=686 bgcolor=#d6d6d6
| 447686 ||  || — || January 24, 2007 || Mount Lemmon || Mount Lemmon Survey || — || align=right | 1.7 km || 
|-id=687 bgcolor=#fefefe
| 447687 ||  || — || January 24, 2007 || Mount Lemmon || Mount Lemmon Survey || — || align=right data-sort-value="0.68" | 680 m || 
|-id=688 bgcolor=#d6d6d6
| 447688 ||  || — || January 24, 2007 || Mount Lemmon || Mount Lemmon Survey || — || align=right | 2.8 km || 
|-id=689 bgcolor=#d6d6d6
| 447689 ||  || — || January 28, 2007 || Mount Lemmon || Mount Lemmon Survey || EOS || align=right | 1.7 km || 
|-id=690 bgcolor=#d6d6d6
| 447690 ||  || — || February 7, 2007 || Mount Lemmon || Mount Lemmon Survey || — || align=right | 2.9 km || 
|-id=691 bgcolor=#fefefe
| 447691 ||  || — || February 6, 2007 || Kitt Peak || Spacewatch || — || align=right data-sort-value="0.59" | 590 m || 
|-id=692 bgcolor=#fefefe
| 447692 ||  || — || February 7, 2007 || Kitt Peak || Spacewatch || — || align=right data-sort-value="0.86" | 860 m || 
|-id=693 bgcolor=#d6d6d6
| 447693 ||  || — || February 10, 2007 || Mount Lemmon || Mount Lemmon Survey || — || align=right | 1.9 km || 
|-id=694 bgcolor=#d6d6d6
| 447694 ||  || — || November 1, 2006 || Kitt Peak || Spacewatch || — || align=right | 3.7 km || 
|-id=695 bgcolor=#d6d6d6
| 447695 ||  || — || February 17, 2007 || Mount Lemmon || Mount Lemmon Survey || — || align=right | 2.0 km || 
|-id=696 bgcolor=#d6d6d6
| 447696 ||  || — || January 27, 2007 || Mount Lemmon || Mount Lemmon Survey || — || align=right | 2.9 km || 
|-id=697 bgcolor=#fefefe
| 447697 ||  || — || January 28, 2007 || Mount Lemmon || Mount Lemmon Survey || — || align=right data-sort-value="0.75" | 750 m || 
|-id=698 bgcolor=#d6d6d6
| 447698 ||  || — || January 28, 2007 || Mount Lemmon || Mount Lemmon Survey || — || align=right | 2.6 km || 
|-id=699 bgcolor=#d6d6d6
| 447699 ||  || — || February 21, 2007 || Kitt Peak || Spacewatch || — || align=right | 3.1 km || 
|-id=700 bgcolor=#d6d6d6
| 447700 ||  || — || January 28, 2007 || Mount Lemmon || Mount Lemmon Survey || — || align=right | 2.7 km || 
|}

447701–447800 

|-bgcolor=#fefefe
| 447701 ||  || — || January 28, 2007 || Mount Lemmon || Mount Lemmon Survey || V || align=right data-sort-value="0.68" | 680 m || 
|-id=702 bgcolor=#fefefe
| 447702 ||  || — || February 23, 2007 || Kitt Peak || Spacewatch || — || align=right data-sort-value="0.53" | 530 m || 
|-id=703 bgcolor=#fefefe
| 447703 ||  || — || March 9, 2007 || Kitt Peak || Spacewatch || — || align=right data-sort-value="0.68" | 680 m || 
|-id=704 bgcolor=#fefefe
| 447704 ||  || — || March 9, 2007 || Kitt Peak || Spacewatch || — || align=right data-sort-value="0.86" | 860 m || 
|-id=705 bgcolor=#d6d6d6
| 447705 ||  || — || March 9, 2007 || Mount Lemmon || Mount Lemmon Survey || — || align=right | 2.5 km || 
|-id=706 bgcolor=#d6d6d6
| 447706 ||  || — || February 25, 2007 || Kitt Peak || Spacewatch || — || align=right | 2.3 km || 
|-id=707 bgcolor=#d6d6d6
| 447707 ||  || — || March 10, 2007 || Mount Lemmon || Mount Lemmon Survey || — || align=right | 2.9 km || 
|-id=708 bgcolor=#fefefe
| 447708 ||  || — || March 10, 2007 || Kitt Peak || Spacewatch || — || align=right data-sort-value="0.77" | 770 m || 
|-id=709 bgcolor=#fefefe
| 447709 ||  || — || March 11, 2007 || Kitt Peak || Spacewatch || — || align=right data-sort-value="0.55" | 550 m || 
|-id=710 bgcolor=#fefefe
| 447710 ||  || — || March 13, 2007 || Mount Lemmon || Mount Lemmon Survey || — || align=right data-sort-value="0.78" | 780 m || 
|-id=711 bgcolor=#d6d6d6
| 447711 ||  || — || March 13, 2007 || Mount Lemmon || Mount Lemmon Survey || EOS || align=right | 2.3 km || 
|-id=712 bgcolor=#d6d6d6
| 447712 ||  || — || March 9, 2007 || Mount Lemmon || Mount Lemmon Survey || — || align=right | 2.7 km || 
|-id=713 bgcolor=#d6d6d6
| 447713 ||  || — || February 21, 2007 || Kitt Peak || Spacewatch || — || align=right | 2.5 km || 
|-id=714 bgcolor=#d6d6d6
| 447714 ||  || — || March 9, 2007 || Mount Lemmon || Mount Lemmon Survey || EOS || align=right | 1.8 km || 
|-id=715 bgcolor=#d6d6d6
| 447715 ||  || — || March 9, 2007 || Mount Lemmon || Mount Lemmon Survey || — || align=right | 2.0 km || 
|-id=716 bgcolor=#fefefe
| 447716 ||  || — || March 10, 2007 || Mount Lemmon || Mount Lemmon Survey || — || align=right data-sort-value="0.57" | 570 m || 
|-id=717 bgcolor=#fefefe
| 447717 ||  || — || February 26, 2007 || Mount Lemmon || Mount Lemmon Survey || — || align=right data-sort-value="0.70" | 700 m || 
|-id=718 bgcolor=#d6d6d6
| 447718 ||  || — || March 12, 2007 || Mount Lemmon || Mount Lemmon Survey || — || align=right | 2.0 km || 
|-id=719 bgcolor=#d6d6d6
| 447719 ||  || — || December 27, 2006 || Mount Lemmon || Mount Lemmon Survey || — || align=right | 3.7 km || 
|-id=720 bgcolor=#d6d6d6
| 447720 ||  || — || March 12, 2007 || Kitt Peak || Spacewatch || EOS || align=right | 1.6 km || 
|-id=721 bgcolor=#d6d6d6
| 447721 ||  || — || March 15, 2007 || Mount Lemmon || Mount Lemmon Survey || — || align=right | 3.2 km || 
|-id=722 bgcolor=#d6d6d6
| 447722 ||  || — || February 6, 2007 || Kitt Peak || Spacewatch || — || align=right | 2.5 km || 
|-id=723 bgcolor=#d6d6d6
| 447723 ||  || — || March 13, 2007 || Kitt Peak || Spacewatch || — || align=right | 2.3 km || 
|-id=724 bgcolor=#d6d6d6
| 447724 ||  || — || February 21, 2007 || Kitt Peak || Spacewatch || TEL || align=right | 1.00 km || 
|-id=725 bgcolor=#fefefe
| 447725 ||  || — || March 14, 2007 || Kitt Peak || Spacewatch || — || align=right data-sort-value="0.56" | 560 m || 
|-id=726 bgcolor=#d6d6d6
| 447726 ||  || — || March 15, 2007 || Mount Lemmon || Mount Lemmon Survey || — || align=right | 2.8 km || 
|-id=727 bgcolor=#fefefe
| 447727 ||  || — || March 11, 2007 || Kitt Peak || Spacewatch || — || align=right data-sort-value="0.66" | 660 m || 
|-id=728 bgcolor=#d6d6d6
| 447728 ||  || — || March 14, 2007 || Mount Lemmon || Mount Lemmon Survey || — || align=right | 3.3 km || 
|-id=729 bgcolor=#d6d6d6
| 447729 ||  || — || February 23, 2007 || Mount Lemmon || Mount Lemmon Survey || — || align=right | 3.1 km || 
|-id=730 bgcolor=#d6d6d6
| 447730 ||  || — || February 25, 2007 || Mount Lemmon || Mount Lemmon Survey || — || align=right | 3.2 km || 
|-id=731 bgcolor=#d6d6d6
| 447731 ||  || — || March 10, 2007 || Mount Lemmon || Mount Lemmon Survey || — || align=right | 2.4 km || 
|-id=732 bgcolor=#d6d6d6
| 447732 ||  || — || March 13, 2007 || Kitt Peak || Spacewatch || — || align=right | 2.4 km || 
|-id=733 bgcolor=#d6d6d6
| 447733 ||  || — || February 23, 2007 || Mount Lemmon || Mount Lemmon Survey || — || align=right | 2.9 km || 
|-id=734 bgcolor=#d6d6d6
| 447734 ||  || — || March 20, 2007 || Catalina || CSS || — || align=right | 3.4 km || 
|-id=735 bgcolor=#fefefe
| 447735 ||  || — || March 20, 2007 || Mount Lemmon || Mount Lemmon Survey || — || align=right data-sort-value="0.62" | 620 m || 
|-id=736 bgcolor=#fefefe
| 447736 ||  || — || March 20, 2007 || Mount Lemmon || Mount Lemmon Survey || — || align=right data-sort-value="0.71" | 710 m || 
|-id=737 bgcolor=#d6d6d6
| 447737 ||  || — || March 26, 2007 || Mount Lemmon || Mount Lemmon Survey || — || align=right | 3.1 km || 
|-id=738 bgcolor=#d6d6d6
| 447738 ||  || — || March 10, 2007 || Kitt Peak || Spacewatch || — || align=right | 3.1 km || 
|-id=739 bgcolor=#fefefe
| 447739 ||  || — || April 13, 2007 || Siding Spring || SSS || — || align=right data-sort-value="0.87" | 870 m || 
|-id=740 bgcolor=#fefefe
| 447740 ||  || — || March 16, 2007 || Kitt Peak || Spacewatch || — || align=right data-sort-value="0.62" | 620 m || 
|-id=741 bgcolor=#d6d6d6
| 447741 ||  || — || March 20, 2007 || Catalina || CSS || Tj (2.99) || align=right | 3.5 km || 
|-id=742 bgcolor=#fefefe
| 447742 ||  || — || April 14, 2007 || Kitt Peak || Spacewatch || — || align=right data-sort-value="0.76" | 760 m || 
|-id=743 bgcolor=#d6d6d6
| 447743 ||  || — || October 12, 1998 || Kitt Peak || Spacewatch || — || align=right | 3.0 km || 
|-id=744 bgcolor=#fefefe
| 447744 ||  || — || April 7, 2007 || Mount Lemmon || Mount Lemmon Survey || (1338) || align=right data-sort-value="0.59" | 590 m || 
|-id=745 bgcolor=#fefefe
| 447745 ||  || — || April 16, 2007 || Anderson Mesa || LONEOS || — || align=right | 1.2 km || 
|-id=746 bgcolor=#d6d6d6
| 447746 ||  || — || April 16, 2007 || Catalina || CSS || — || align=right | 3.8 km || 
|-id=747 bgcolor=#fefefe
| 447747 ||  || — || April 18, 2007 || Kitt Peak || Spacewatch || — || align=right data-sort-value="0.75" | 750 m || 
|-id=748 bgcolor=#fefefe
| 447748 ||  || — || April 11, 2007 || Mount Lemmon || Mount Lemmon Survey || CLA || align=right | 1.5 km || 
|-id=749 bgcolor=#d6d6d6
| 447749 ||  || — || April 20, 2007 || Kitt Peak || Spacewatch || — || align=right | 2.3 km || 
|-id=750 bgcolor=#fefefe
| 447750 ||  || — || September 17, 2004 || Kitt Peak || Spacewatch || NYS || align=right data-sort-value="0.60" | 600 m || 
|-id=751 bgcolor=#fefefe
| 447751 ||  || — || April 23, 2007 || Kitt Peak || Spacewatch || NYS || align=right data-sort-value="0.72" | 720 m || 
|-id=752 bgcolor=#d6d6d6
| 447752 ||  || — || January 6, 2006 || Catalina || CSS || LIX || align=right | 4.5 km || 
|-id=753 bgcolor=#d6d6d6
| 447753 ||  || — || March 13, 2007 || Mount Lemmon || Mount Lemmon Survey || — || align=right | 2.8 km || 
|-id=754 bgcolor=#fefefe
| 447754 ||  || — || April 19, 2007 || Mount Lemmon || Mount Lemmon Survey || — || align=right data-sort-value="0.82" | 820 m || 
|-id=755 bgcolor=#FFC2E0
| 447755 ||  || — || May 9, 2007 || Catalina || CSS || APOPHAcritical || align=right data-sort-value="0.41" | 410 m || 
|-id=756 bgcolor=#fefefe
| 447756 ||  || — || March 16, 2007 || Mount Lemmon || Mount Lemmon Survey || — || align=right data-sort-value="0.66" | 660 m || 
|-id=757 bgcolor=#fefefe
| 447757 ||  || — || April 18, 2007 || Mount Lemmon || Mount Lemmon Survey || NYS || align=right data-sort-value="0.63" | 630 m || 
|-id=758 bgcolor=#d6d6d6
| 447758 ||  || — || October 15, 2004 || Mount Lemmon || Mount Lemmon Survey || — || align=right | 4.1 km || 
|-id=759 bgcolor=#fefefe
| 447759 ||  || — || March 26, 2007 || Kitt Peak || Spacewatch || V || align=right data-sort-value="0.56" | 560 m || 
|-id=760 bgcolor=#fefefe
| 447760 ||  || — || May 9, 2007 || Kitt Peak || Spacewatch || — || align=right | 1.6 km || 
|-id=761 bgcolor=#fefefe
| 447761 ||  || — || May 9, 2007 || Mount Lemmon || Mount Lemmon Survey || — || align=right data-sort-value="0.63" | 630 m || 
|-id=762 bgcolor=#fefefe
| 447762 ||  || — || May 9, 2007 || Kitt Peak || Spacewatch || — || align=right data-sort-value="0.64" | 640 m || 
|-id=763 bgcolor=#fefefe
| 447763 ||  || — || June 8, 2007 || Kitt Peak || Spacewatch || — || align=right data-sort-value="0.86" | 860 m || 
|-id=764 bgcolor=#fefefe
| 447764 ||  || — || May 7, 2007 || Kitt Peak || Spacewatch || NYS || align=right data-sort-value="0.76" | 760 m || 
|-id=765 bgcolor=#d6d6d6
| 447765 ||  || — || June 10, 2007 || Kitt Peak || Spacewatch || — || align=right | 3.2 km || 
|-id=766 bgcolor=#d6d6d6
| 447766 ||  || — || June 10, 2007 || Kitt Peak || Spacewatch || — || align=right | 3.7 km || 
|-id=767 bgcolor=#d6d6d6
| 447767 ||  || — || June 12, 2007 || Kitt Peak || Spacewatch || — || align=right | 2.8 km || 
|-id=768 bgcolor=#fefefe
| 447768 ||  || — || May 11, 2007 || Mount Lemmon || Mount Lemmon Survey || — || align=right data-sort-value="0.78" | 780 m || 
|-id=769 bgcolor=#fefefe
| 447769 ||  || — || April 25, 2007 || Mount Lemmon || Mount Lemmon Survey || — || align=right data-sort-value="0.95" | 950 m || 
|-id=770 bgcolor=#fefefe
| 447770 ||  || — || June 9, 2007 || Kitt Peak || Spacewatch || NYS || align=right data-sort-value="0.63" | 630 m || 
|-id=771 bgcolor=#fefefe
| 447771 ||  || — || August 10, 2007 || Kitt Peak || Spacewatch || — || align=right data-sort-value="0.94" | 940 m || 
|-id=772 bgcolor=#fefefe
| 447772 ||  || — || August 9, 2007 || Socorro || LINEAR || — || align=right data-sort-value="0.94" | 940 m || 
|-id=773 bgcolor=#fefefe
| 447773 ||  || — || August 10, 2007 || Kitt Peak || Spacewatch || — || align=right data-sort-value="0.78" | 780 m || 
|-id=774 bgcolor=#fefefe
| 447774 ||  || — || September 5, 2007 || Siding Spring || K. Sárneczky, L. Kiss || NYS || align=right data-sort-value="0.76" | 760 m || 
|-id=775 bgcolor=#E9E9E9
| 447775 ||  || — || September 10, 2007 || Mount Lemmon || Mount Lemmon Survey || — || align=right data-sort-value="0.78" | 780 m || 
|-id=776 bgcolor=#fefefe
| 447776 ||  || — || September 10, 2007 || Mount Lemmon || Mount Lemmon Survey || — || align=right data-sort-value="0.68" | 680 m || 
|-id=777 bgcolor=#fefefe
| 447777 ||  || — || September 10, 2007 || Mount Lemmon || Mount Lemmon Survey || H || align=right data-sort-value="0.71" | 710 m || 
|-id=778 bgcolor=#fefefe
| 447778 ||  || — || September 11, 2007 || Kitt Peak || Spacewatch || H || align=right data-sort-value="0.63" | 630 m || 
|-id=779 bgcolor=#d6d6d6
| 447779 ||  || — || September 12, 2007 || Mount Lemmon || Mount Lemmon Survey || 3:2 || align=right | 3.9 km || 
|-id=780 bgcolor=#fefefe
| 447780 ||  || — || September 11, 2007 || XuYi || PMO NEO || — || align=right data-sort-value="0.96" | 960 m || 
|-id=781 bgcolor=#E9E9E9
| 447781 ||  || — || August 24, 2007 || Kitt Peak || Spacewatch || — || align=right | 1.0 km || 
|-id=782 bgcolor=#d6d6d6
| 447782 ||  || — || September 12, 2007 || Kitt Peak || Spacewatch || SHU3:2 || align=right | 5.8 km || 
|-id=783 bgcolor=#E9E9E9
| 447783 ||  || — || September 13, 2007 || Kitt Peak || Spacewatch || — || align=right data-sort-value="0.73" | 730 m || 
|-id=784 bgcolor=#fefefe
| 447784 ||  || — || May 8, 2002 || Kitt Peak || Spacewatch || NYS || align=right data-sort-value="0.77" | 770 m || 
|-id=785 bgcolor=#d6d6d6
| 447785 ||  || — || September 14, 2007 || Mount Lemmon || Mount Lemmon Survey || SHU3:2 || align=right | 5.1 km || 
|-id=786 bgcolor=#fefefe
| 447786 ||  || — || September 14, 2007 || Kitt Peak || Spacewatch || H || align=right data-sort-value="0.53" | 530 m || 
|-id=787 bgcolor=#E9E9E9
| 447787 ||  || — || September 14, 2007 || Mount Lemmon || Mount Lemmon Survey || — || align=right | 1.0 km || 
|-id=788 bgcolor=#E9E9E9
| 447788 ||  || — || September 15, 2007 || Mount Lemmon || Mount Lemmon Survey || — || align=right | 1.4 km || 
|-id=789 bgcolor=#E9E9E9
| 447789 ||  || — || September 10, 2007 || Kitt Peak || Spacewatch || — || align=right | 1.0 km || 
|-id=790 bgcolor=#E9E9E9
| 447790 ||  || — || September 10, 2007 || Mount Lemmon || Mount Lemmon Survey || KON || align=right | 2.0 km || 
|-id=791 bgcolor=#E9E9E9
| 447791 ||  || — || September 9, 2007 || Mount Lemmon || Mount Lemmon Survey || — || align=right data-sort-value="0.81" | 810 m || 
|-id=792 bgcolor=#E9E9E9
| 447792 ||  || — || September 14, 2007 || Mount Lemmon || Mount Lemmon Survey || (5) || align=right data-sort-value="0.74" | 740 m || 
|-id=793 bgcolor=#E9E9E9
| 447793 ||  || — || September 12, 2007 || Mount Lemmon || Mount Lemmon Survey || critical || align=right data-sort-value="0.65" | 650 m || 
|-id=794 bgcolor=#fefefe
| 447794 ||  || — || October 6, 2007 || La Sagra || OAM Obs. || H || align=right data-sort-value="0.66" | 660 m || 
|-id=795 bgcolor=#FFC2E0
| 447795 ||  || — || October 8, 2007 || Mount Lemmon || Mount Lemmon Survey || AMO +1km || align=right data-sort-value="0.98" | 980 m || 
|-id=796 bgcolor=#fefefe
| 447796 ||  || — || October 4, 2007 || Kitt Peak || Spacewatch || — || align=right data-sort-value="0.86" | 860 m || 
|-id=797 bgcolor=#E9E9E9
| 447797 ||  || — || September 12, 2007 || Kitt Peak || Spacewatch || — || align=right | 1.1 km || 
|-id=798 bgcolor=#E9E9E9
| 447798 ||  || — || September 9, 2007 || Mount Lemmon || Mount Lemmon Survey || — || align=right data-sort-value="0.94" | 940 m || 
|-id=799 bgcolor=#fefefe
| 447799 ||  || — || September 15, 2007 || Mount Lemmon || Mount Lemmon Survey || — || align=right data-sort-value="0.71" | 710 m || 
|-id=800 bgcolor=#E9E9E9
| 447800 ||  || — || October 5, 2007 || Kitt Peak || Spacewatch || — || align=right data-sort-value="0.70" | 700 m || 
|}

447801–447900 

|-bgcolor=#E9E9E9
| 447801 ||  || — || October 7, 2007 || Mount Lemmon || Mount Lemmon Survey || (5)critical || align=right data-sort-value="0.64" | 640 m || 
|-id=802 bgcolor=#E9E9E9
| 447802 ||  || — || October 8, 2007 || Mount Lemmon || Mount Lemmon Survey || — || align=right data-sort-value="0.71" | 710 m || 
|-id=803 bgcolor=#E9E9E9
| 447803 ||  || — || October 6, 2007 || Kitt Peak || Spacewatch || — || align=right data-sort-value="0.62" | 620 m || 
|-id=804 bgcolor=#E9E9E9
| 447804 ||  || — || October 8, 2007 || Mount Lemmon || Mount Lemmon Survey || — || align=right data-sort-value="0.62" | 620 m || 
|-id=805 bgcolor=#E9E9E9
| 447805 ||  || — || October 8, 2007 || Mount Lemmon || Mount Lemmon Survey || — || align=right data-sort-value="0.85" | 850 m || 
|-id=806 bgcolor=#E9E9E9
| 447806 ||  || — || October 7, 2007 || Mount Lemmon || Mount Lemmon Survey || — || align=right data-sort-value="0.66" | 660 m || 
|-id=807 bgcolor=#FA8072
| 447807 ||  || — || October 7, 2007 || Mount Lemmon || Mount Lemmon Survey || H || align=right data-sort-value="0.53" | 530 m || 
|-id=808 bgcolor=#E9E9E9
| 447808 ||  || — || September 14, 2007 || Mount Lemmon || Mount Lemmon Survey || — || align=right | 1.0 km || 
|-id=809 bgcolor=#E9E9E9
| 447809 ||  || — || October 8, 2007 || Socorro || LINEAR || (5) || align=right data-sort-value="0.59" | 590 m || 
|-id=810 bgcolor=#E9E9E9
| 447810 ||  || — || October 9, 2007 || Socorro || LINEAR || (5) || align=right data-sort-value="0.62" | 620 m || 
|-id=811 bgcolor=#d6d6d6
| 447811 ||  || — || October 9, 2007 || Socorro || LINEAR || Tj (2.96) || align=right | 3.8 km || 
|-id=812 bgcolor=#E9E9E9
| 447812 ||  || — || October 7, 2007 || Mount Lemmon || Mount Lemmon Survey || — || align=right data-sort-value="0.69" | 690 m || 
|-id=813 bgcolor=#E9E9E9
| 447813 ||  || — || October 7, 2007 || Kitt Peak || Spacewatch || — || align=right data-sort-value="0.84" | 840 m || 
|-id=814 bgcolor=#fefefe
| 447814 ||  || — || October 7, 2007 || Catalina || CSS || H || align=right data-sort-value="0.68" | 680 m || 
|-id=815 bgcolor=#E9E9E9
| 447815 ||  || — || September 18, 2007 || Mount Lemmon || Mount Lemmon Survey || — || align=right data-sort-value="0.79" | 790 m || 
|-id=816 bgcolor=#E9E9E9
| 447816 ||  || — || October 9, 2007 || Mount Lemmon || Mount Lemmon Survey || — || align=right data-sort-value="0.90" | 900 m || 
|-id=817 bgcolor=#E9E9E9
| 447817 ||  || — || September 15, 2007 || Mount Lemmon || Mount Lemmon Survey || (5) || align=right data-sort-value="0.71" | 710 m || 
|-id=818 bgcolor=#E9E9E9
| 447818 ||  || — || September 8, 2007 || Mount Lemmon || Mount Lemmon Survey || — || align=right | 1.4 km || 
|-id=819 bgcolor=#fefefe
| 447819 ||  || — || October 10, 2007 || Mount Lemmon || Mount Lemmon Survey || — || align=right | 1.1 km || 
|-id=820 bgcolor=#E9E9E9
| 447820 ||  || — || October 10, 2007 || Kitt Peak || Spacewatch || — || align=right data-sort-value="0.75" | 750 m || 
|-id=821 bgcolor=#E9E9E9
| 447821 ||  || — || October 10, 2007 || Kitt Peak || Spacewatch || — || align=right data-sort-value="0.80" | 800 m || 
|-id=822 bgcolor=#E9E9E9
| 447822 ||  || — || October 10, 2007 || Kitt Peak || Spacewatch || — || align=right data-sort-value="0.69" | 690 m || 
|-id=823 bgcolor=#E9E9E9
| 447823 ||  || — || October 10, 2007 || Kitt Peak || Spacewatch || — || align=right data-sort-value="0.68" | 680 m || 
|-id=824 bgcolor=#E9E9E9
| 447824 ||  || — || October 4, 2007 || Kitt Peak || Spacewatch || — || align=right data-sort-value="0.90" | 900 m || 
|-id=825 bgcolor=#E9E9E9
| 447825 ||  || — || October 11, 2007 || Kitt Peak || Spacewatch || — || align=right data-sort-value="0.87" | 870 m || 
|-id=826 bgcolor=#E9E9E9
| 447826 ||  || — || October 11, 2007 || Kitt Peak || Spacewatch || — || align=right data-sort-value="0.78" | 780 m || 
|-id=827 bgcolor=#E9E9E9
| 447827 ||  || — || October 11, 2007 || Kitt Peak || Spacewatch || — || align=right | 1.8 km || 
|-id=828 bgcolor=#fefefe
| 447828 ||  || — || October 13, 2007 || Mount Lemmon || Mount Lemmon Survey || — || align=right data-sort-value="0.88" | 880 m || 
|-id=829 bgcolor=#d6d6d6
| 447829 ||  || — || September 10, 2007 || Mount Lemmon || Mount Lemmon Survey || SHU3:2 || align=right | 6.4 km || 
|-id=830 bgcolor=#fefefe
| 447830 ||  || — || October 13, 2007 || Catalina || CSS || H || align=right data-sort-value="0.69" | 690 m || 
|-id=831 bgcolor=#E9E9E9
| 447831 ||  || — || October 21, 2003 || Kitt Peak || Spacewatch || — || align=right data-sort-value="0.68" | 680 m || 
|-id=832 bgcolor=#E9E9E9
| 447832 ||  || — || October 15, 2007 || Kitt Peak || Spacewatch || — || align=right data-sort-value="0.94" | 940 m || 
|-id=833 bgcolor=#E9E9E9
| 447833 ||  || — || October 15, 2007 || Kitt Peak || Spacewatch || EUN || align=right data-sort-value="0.84" | 840 m || 
|-id=834 bgcolor=#E9E9E9
| 447834 ||  || — || October 4, 2007 || Kitt Peak || Spacewatch || RAF || align=right data-sort-value="0.62" | 620 m || 
|-id=835 bgcolor=#E9E9E9
| 447835 ||  || — || October 10, 2007 || Kitt Peak || Spacewatch || — || align=right | 1.7 km || 
|-id=836 bgcolor=#E9E9E9
| 447836 ||  || — || October 12, 2007 || Mount Lemmon || Mount Lemmon Survey || — || align=right data-sort-value="0.86" | 860 m || 
|-id=837 bgcolor=#E9E9E9
| 447837 ||  || — || October 16, 2007 || Kitt Peak || Spacewatch || BRG || align=right | 1.3 km || 
|-id=838 bgcolor=#E9E9E9
| 447838 ||  || — || October 18, 2007 || Kitt Peak || Spacewatch || — || align=right | 1.5 km || 
|-id=839 bgcolor=#E9E9E9
| 447839 ||  || — || October 19, 2007 || Anderson Mesa || LONEOS || — || align=right data-sort-value="0.86" | 860 m || 
|-id=840 bgcolor=#E9E9E9
| 447840 ||  || — || September 12, 2007 || Mount Lemmon || Mount Lemmon Survey || — || align=right data-sort-value="0.67" | 670 m || 
|-id=841 bgcolor=#E9E9E9
| 447841 ||  || — || October 20, 2007 || Catalina || CSS || — || align=right data-sort-value="0.97" | 970 m || 
|-id=842 bgcolor=#E9E9E9
| 447842 ||  || — || October 11, 2007 || Kitt Peak || Spacewatch || WIT || align=right data-sort-value="0.84" | 840 m || 
|-id=843 bgcolor=#E9E9E9
| 447843 ||  || — || October 10, 2007 || Kitt Peak || Spacewatch || — || align=right data-sort-value="0.69" | 690 m || 
|-id=844 bgcolor=#E9E9E9
| 447844 ||  || — || October 30, 2007 || Mount Lemmon || Mount Lemmon Survey || — || align=right data-sort-value="0.82" | 820 m || 
|-id=845 bgcolor=#E9E9E9
| 447845 ||  || — || October 10, 2007 || Kitt Peak || Spacewatch || — || align=right data-sort-value="0.73" | 730 m || 
|-id=846 bgcolor=#E9E9E9
| 447846 ||  || — || October 15, 2007 || Kitt Peak || Spacewatch || — || align=right data-sort-value="0.90" | 900 m || 
|-id=847 bgcolor=#E9E9E9
| 447847 ||  || — || September 26, 2007 || Mount Lemmon || Mount Lemmon Survey || KON || align=right | 2.3 km || 
|-id=848 bgcolor=#E9E9E9
| 447848 ||  || — || October 31, 2007 || Kitt Peak || Spacewatch || — || align=right data-sort-value="0.94" | 940 m || 
|-id=849 bgcolor=#d6d6d6
| 447849 ||  || — || October 19, 2007 || Catalina || CSS || 3:2 || align=right | 4.7 km || 
|-id=850 bgcolor=#E9E9E9
| 447850 ||  || — || October 19, 2007 || Socorro || LINEAR || (5) || align=right data-sort-value="0.77" | 770 m || 
|-id=851 bgcolor=#E9E9E9
| 447851 ||  || — || October 19, 2007 || Catalina || CSS || RAF || align=right data-sort-value="0.90" | 900 m || 
|-id=852 bgcolor=#E9E9E9
| 447852 ||  || — || October 21, 2007 || Catalina || CSS || — || align=right | 1.4 km || 
|-id=853 bgcolor=#E9E9E9
| 447853 ||  || — || October 24, 2007 || Mount Lemmon || Mount Lemmon Survey || — || align=right data-sort-value="0.86" | 860 m || 
|-id=854 bgcolor=#E9E9E9
| 447854 ||  || — || October 24, 2007 || Mount Lemmon || Mount Lemmon Survey || KON || align=right | 2.1 km || 
|-id=855 bgcolor=#fefefe
| 447855 ||  || — || November 2, 2007 || Socorro || LINEAR || H || align=right data-sort-value="0.75" | 750 m || 
|-id=856 bgcolor=#E9E9E9
| 447856 ||  || — || November 2, 2007 || Socorro || LINEAR || MAR || align=right | 1.1 km || 
|-id=857 bgcolor=#E9E9E9
| 447857 ||  || — || November 2, 2007 || Kitt Peak || Spacewatch || — || align=right data-sort-value="0.68" | 680 m || 
|-id=858 bgcolor=#E9E9E9
| 447858 ||  || — || November 2, 2007 || Catalina || CSS || — || align=right | 1.2 km || 
|-id=859 bgcolor=#E9E9E9
| 447859 ||  || — || October 9, 2007 || Catalina || CSS || EUN || align=right | 1.2 km || 
|-id=860 bgcolor=#fefefe
| 447860 ||  || — || November 1, 2007 || Kitt Peak || Spacewatch || H || align=right data-sort-value="0.69" | 690 m || 
|-id=861 bgcolor=#E9E9E9
| 447861 ||  || — || November 1, 2007 || Kitt Peak || Spacewatch || — || align=right | 2.1 km || 
|-id=862 bgcolor=#E9E9E9
| 447862 ||  || — || October 16, 2007 || Mount Lemmon || Mount Lemmon Survey || EUN || align=right data-sort-value="0.88" | 880 m || 
|-id=863 bgcolor=#E9E9E9
| 447863 ||  || — || November 1, 2007 || Kitt Peak || Spacewatch || ADE || align=right | 1.9 km || 
|-id=864 bgcolor=#E9E9E9
| 447864 ||  || — || September 14, 2007 || Mount Lemmon || Mount Lemmon Survey || — || align=right | 1.1 km || 
|-id=865 bgcolor=#E9E9E9
| 447865 ||  || — || November 1, 2007 || Kitt Peak || Spacewatch || — || align=right | 1.2 km || 
|-id=866 bgcolor=#E9E9E9
| 447866 ||  || — || November 2, 2007 || Kitt Peak || Spacewatch || — || align=right | 2.9 km || 
|-id=867 bgcolor=#fefefe
| 447867 ||  || — || September 10, 2007 || Kitt Peak || Spacewatch || — || align=right | 1.1 km || 
|-id=868 bgcolor=#E9E9E9
| 447868 ||  || — || October 16, 2007 || Mount Lemmon || Mount Lemmon Survey || — || align=right | 1.2 km || 
|-id=869 bgcolor=#E9E9E9
| 447869 ||  || — || October 14, 2007 || Mount Lemmon || Mount Lemmon Survey || EUN || align=right | 1.2 km || 
|-id=870 bgcolor=#E9E9E9
| 447870 ||  || — || November 1, 2007 || Kitt Peak || Spacewatch || — || align=right data-sort-value="0.62" | 620 m || 
|-id=871 bgcolor=#E9E9E9
| 447871 ||  || — || November 3, 2007 || Kitt Peak || Spacewatch || — || align=right data-sort-value="0.82" | 820 m || 
|-id=872 bgcolor=#E9E9E9
| 447872 ||  || — || October 15, 2007 || Mount Lemmon || Mount Lemmon Survey || — || align=right | 1.2 km || 
|-id=873 bgcolor=#E9E9E9
| 447873 ||  || — || October 17, 2007 || Mount Lemmon || Mount Lemmon Survey || — || align=right data-sort-value="0.71" | 710 m || 
|-id=874 bgcolor=#E9E9E9
| 447874 ||  || — || November 5, 2007 || Kitt Peak || Spacewatch || BRG || align=right | 1.0 km || 
|-id=875 bgcolor=#E9E9E9
| 447875 ||  || — || November 5, 2007 || Kitt Peak || Spacewatch || — || align=right | 1.9 km || 
|-id=876 bgcolor=#E9E9E9
| 447876 ||  || — || November 7, 2007 || Kitt Peak || Spacewatch || — || align=right data-sort-value="0.74" | 740 m || 
|-id=877 bgcolor=#E9E9E9
| 447877 ||  || — || October 12, 2007 || Kitt Peak || Spacewatch || — || align=right data-sort-value="0.86" | 860 m || 
|-id=878 bgcolor=#E9E9E9
| 447878 ||  || — || September 10, 2007 || Mount Lemmon || Mount Lemmon Survey || — || align=right data-sort-value="0.96" | 960 m || 
|-id=879 bgcolor=#E9E9E9
| 447879 ||  || — || November 7, 2007 || Mount Lemmon || Mount Lemmon Survey || — || align=right | 1.5 km || 
|-id=880 bgcolor=#E9E9E9
| 447880 ||  || — || November 9, 2007 || Kitt Peak || Spacewatch || — || align=right data-sort-value="0.62" | 620 m || 
|-id=881 bgcolor=#E9E9E9
| 447881 ||  || — || November 4, 2007 || Kitt Peak || Spacewatch || — || align=right | 1.4 km || 
|-id=882 bgcolor=#E9E9E9
| 447882 ||  || — || November 12, 2007 || Socorro || LINEAR || — || align=right | 1.0 km || 
|-id=883 bgcolor=#E9E9E9
| 447883 ||  || — || October 9, 2007 || Catalina || CSS || BRG || align=right | 1.6 km || 
|-id=884 bgcolor=#E9E9E9
| 447884 ||  || — || November 15, 2007 || Anderson Mesa || LONEOS || — || align=right data-sort-value="0.91" | 910 m || 
|-id=885 bgcolor=#E9E9E9
| 447885 ||  || — || November 5, 2007 || Kitt Peak || Spacewatch || — || align=right data-sort-value="0.89" | 890 m || 
|-id=886 bgcolor=#E9E9E9
| 447886 ||  || — || November 7, 2007 || Kitt Peak || Spacewatch || — || align=right | 1.7 km || 
|-id=887 bgcolor=#E9E9E9
| 447887 ||  || — || November 4, 2007 || Kitt Peak || Spacewatch || — || align=right | 1.3 km || 
|-id=888 bgcolor=#E9E9E9
| 447888 ||  || — || November 8, 2007 || Mount Lemmon || Mount Lemmon Survey || — || align=right | 1.2 km || 
|-id=889 bgcolor=#E9E9E9
| 447889 ||  || — || November 3, 2007 || Mount Lemmon || Mount Lemmon Survey || — || align=right | 2.2 km || 
|-id=890 bgcolor=#E9E9E9
| 447890 ||  || — || November 12, 2007 || Mount Lemmon || Mount Lemmon Survey || — || align=right | 1.4 km || 
|-id=891 bgcolor=#E9E9E9
| 447891 ||  || — || November 14, 2007 || Kitt Peak || Spacewatch || — || align=right | 1.4 km || 
|-id=892 bgcolor=#E9E9E9
| 447892 ||  || — || November 17, 2007 || Catalina || CSS || — || align=right data-sort-value="0.71" | 710 m || 
|-id=893 bgcolor=#E9E9E9
| 447893 ||  || — || November 18, 2007 || Mount Lemmon || Mount Lemmon Survey || — || align=right data-sort-value="0.90" | 900 m || 
|-id=894 bgcolor=#E9E9E9
| 447894 ||  || — || October 9, 2007 || Mount Lemmon || Mount Lemmon Survey || — || align=right data-sort-value="0.80" | 800 m || 
|-id=895 bgcolor=#E9E9E9
| 447895 ||  || — || November 19, 2007 || Mount Lemmon || Mount Lemmon Survey || (5) || align=right data-sort-value="0.65" | 650 m || 
|-id=896 bgcolor=#E9E9E9
| 447896 ||  || — || August 24, 2007 || Kitt Peak || Spacewatch || — || align=right | 1.0 km || 
|-id=897 bgcolor=#E9E9E9
| 447897 ||  || — || November 8, 2007 || Kitt Peak || Spacewatch || — || align=right | 1.4 km || 
|-id=898 bgcolor=#E9E9E9
| 447898 ||  || — || November 19, 2007 || Kitt Peak || Spacewatch || — || align=right | 1.2 km || 
|-id=899 bgcolor=#E9E9E9
| 447899 ||  || — || November 20, 2007 || Mount Lemmon || Mount Lemmon Survey || — || align=right | 1.6 km || 
|-id=900 bgcolor=#fefefe
| 447900 ||  || — || October 17, 2007 || Mount Lemmon || Mount Lemmon Survey || H || align=right data-sort-value="0.51" | 510 m || 
|}

447901–448000 

|-bgcolor=#fefefe
| 447901 ||  || — || December 4, 2007 || Mount Lemmon || Mount Lemmon Survey || H || align=right | 1.3 km || 
|-id=902 bgcolor=#E9E9E9
| 447902 ||  || — || November 13, 2007 || Mount Lemmon || Mount Lemmon Survey || — || align=right data-sort-value="0.92" | 920 m || 
|-id=903 bgcolor=#FFC2E0
| 447903 ||  || — || December 13, 2007 || Socorro || LINEAR || APO || align=right data-sort-value="0.68" | 680 m || 
|-id=904 bgcolor=#E9E9E9
| 447904 ||  || — || December 12, 2007 || La Sagra || OAM Obs. || (5) || align=right data-sort-value="0.78" | 780 m || 
|-id=905 bgcolor=#E9E9E9
| 447905 ||  || — || November 9, 2007 || Mount Lemmon || Mount Lemmon Survey || — || align=right | 1.5 km || 
|-id=906 bgcolor=#E9E9E9
| 447906 ||  || — || December 13, 2007 || Socorro || LINEAR || — || align=right | 1.4 km || 
|-id=907 bgcolor=#E9E9E9
| 447907 ||  || — || November 3, 2007 || Mount Lemmon || Mount Lemmon Survey || — || align=right | 1.4 km || 
|-id=908 bgcolor=#E9E9E9
| 447908 ||  || — || November 20, 2007 || Catalina || CSS || — || align=right | 1.5 km || 
|-id=909 bgcolor=#E9E9E9
| 447909 ||  || — || December 4, 2007 || Catalina || CSS || — || align=right | 1.1 km || 
|-id=910 bgcolor=#E9E9E9
| 447910 ||  || — || November 6, 2007 || Kitt Peak || Spacewatch || — || align=right | 1.4 km || 
|-id=911 bgcolor=#E9E9E9
| 447911 ||  || — || December 2, 2007 || Socorro || LINEAR || — || align=right | 2.4 km || 
|-id=912 bgcolor=#E9E9E9
| 447912 ||  || — || November 11, 2007 || Mount Lemmon || Mount Lemmon Survey || — || align=right | 2.6 km || 
|-id=913 bgcolor=#E9E9E9
| 447913 ||  || — || December 16, 2007 || Kitt Peak || Spacewatch || (5) || align=right data-sort-value="0.69" | 690 m || 
|-id=914 bgcolor=#E9E9E9
| 447914 ||  || — || November 3, 2007 || Mount Lemmon || Mount Lemmon Survey || (5) || align=right data-sort-value="0.83" | 830 m || 
|-id=915 bgcolor=#E9E9E9
| 447915 ||  || — || August 30, 1998 || Kitt Peak || Spacewatch || — || align=right | 1.3 km || 
|-id=916 bgcolor=#E9E9E9
| 447916 ||  || — || December 30, 2007 || Kitt Peak || Spacewatch || — || align=right | 1.1 km || 
|-id=917 bgcolor=#E9E9E9
| 447917 ||  || — || December 30, 2007 || La Sagra || OAM Obs. || — || align=right data-sort-value="0.78" | 780 m || 
|-id=918 bgcolor=#E9E9E9
| 447918 ||  || — || December 28, 2007 || Kitt Peak || Spacewatch || — || align=right | 2.1 km || 
|-id=919 bgcolor=#E9E9E9
| 447919 ||  || — || August 21, 2006 || Kitt Peak || Spacewatch || — || align=right | 1.7 km || 
|-id=920 bgcolor=#E9E9E9
| 447920 ||  || — || December 30, 2007 || Catalina || CSS || — || align=right | 1.6 km || 
|-id=921 bgcolor=#E9E9E9
| 447921 ||  || — || December 18, 2007 || Mount Lemmon || Mount Lemmon Survey || — || align=right | 1.3 km || 
|-id=922 bgcolor=#E9E9E9
| 447922 ||  || — || December 31, 2007 || Mount Lemmon || Mount Lemmon Survey || — || align=right | 1.3 km || 
|-id=923 bgcolor=#E9E9E9
| 447923 ||  || — || December 16, 2007 || Catalina || CSS || — || align=right data-sort-value="0.98" | 980 m || 
|-id=924 bgcolor=#E9E9E9
| 447924 ||  || — || December 30, 2007 || Kitt Peak || Spacewatch || — || align=right | 1.5 km || 
|-id=925 bgcolor=#E9E9E9
| 447925 ||  || — || November 2, 2007 || Mount Lemmon || Mount Lemmon Survey || — || align=right | 1.1 km || 
|-id=926 bgcolor=#FA8072
| 447926 ||  || — || January 9, 2008 || Lulin Observatory || LUSS || — || align=right data-sort-value="0.86" | 860 m || 
|-id=927 bgcolor=#E9E9E9
| 447927 ||  || — || October 10, 2007 || Mount Lemmon || Mount Lemmon Survey || — || align=right | 1.4 km || 
|-id=928 bgcolor=#E9E9E9
| 447928 ||  || — || December 30, 2007 || Mount Lemmon || Mount Lemmon Survey || — || align=right | 1.5 km || 
|-id=929 bgcolor=#d6d6d6
| 447929 ||  || — || January 10, 2008 || Mount Lemmon || Mount Lemmon Survey || TIR || align=right | 3.2 km || 
|-id=930 bgcolor=#E9E9E9
| 447930 ||  || — || January 10, 2008 || Mount Lemmon || Mount Lemmon Survey || AGN || align=right data-sort-value="0.96" | 960 m || 
|-id=931 bgcolor=#E9E9E9
| 447931 ||  || — || December 18, 2007 || Mount Lemmon || Mount Lemmon Survey || — || align=right | 2.8 km || 
|-id=932 bgcolor=#E9E9E9
| 447932 ||  || — || January 10, 2008 || Mount Lemmon || Mount Lemmon Survey || — || align=right | 1.3 km || 
|-id=933 bgcolor=#E9E9E9
| 447933 ||  || — || January 10, 2008 || Catalina || CSS || (5) || align=right data-sort-value="0.70" | 700 m || 
|-id=934 bgcolor=#E9E9E9
| 447934 ||  || — || December 31, 2007 || Mount Lemmon || Mount Lemmon Survey || — || align=right | 2.9 km || 
|-id=935 bgcolor=#E9E9E9
| 447935 ||  || — || January 11, 2008 || Kitt Peak || Spacewatch || — || align=right | 1.5 km || 
|-id=936 bgcolor=#E9E9E9
| 447936 ||  || — || January 11, 2008 || Kitt Peak || Spacewatch || MRX || align=right data-sort-value="0.96" | 960 m || 
|-id=937 bgcolor=#E9E9E9
| 447937 ||  || — || January 11, 2008 || Catalina || CSS || — || align=right | 2.0 km || 
|-id=938 bgcolor=#E9E9E9
| 447938 ||  || — || January 12, 2008 || Kitt Peak || Spacewatch || — || align=right | 1.8 km || 
|-id=939 bgcolor=#E9E9E9
| 447939 ||  || — || November 5, 2007 || Mount Lemmon || Mount Lemmon Survey || — || align=right | 1.2 km || 
|-id=940 bgcolor=#E9E9E9
| 447940 ||  || — || January 15, 2008 || Mount Lemmon || Mount Lemmon Survey || — || align=right | 1.1 km || 
|-id=941 bgcolor=#E9E9E9
| 447941 ||  || — || March 17, 2004 || Kitt Peak || Spacewatch || — || align=right | 2.3 km || 
|-id=942 bgcolor=#E9E9E9
| 447942 ||  || — || January 14, 2008 || Kitt Peak || Spacewatch || — || align=right | 1.9 km || 
|-id=943 bgcolor=#E9E9E9
| 447943 ||  || — || January 15, 2008 || Kitt Peak || Spacewatch || — || align=right | 1.2 km || 
|-id=944 bgcolor=#E9E9E9
| 447944 ||  || — || December 30, 2007 || Kitt Peak || Spacewatch || — || align=right | 1.9 km || 
|-id=945 bgcolor=#FA8072
| 447945 ||  || — || December 31, 2007 || Kitt Peak || Spacewatch || — || align=right | 1.0 km || 
|-id=946 bgcolor=#E9E9E9
| 447946 ||  || — || January 10, 2008 || Kitt Peak || Spacewatch || — || align=right | 1.2 km || 
|-id=947 bgcolor=#E9E9E9
| 447947 ||  || — || January 13, 2008 || Kitt Peak || Spacewatch || — || align=right | 1.9 km || 
|-id=948 bgcolor=#E9E9E9
| 447948 ||  || — || January 13, 2008 || Kitt Peak || Spacewatch || — || align=right | 1.1 km || 
|-id=949 bgcolor=#E9E9E9
| 447949 ||  || — || January 11, 2008 || Kitt Peak || Spacewatch || — || align=right | 1.3 km || 
|-id=950 bgcolor=#E9E9E9
| 447950 ||  || — || January 11, 2008 || Kitt Peak || Spacewatch || — || align=right | 2.9 km || 
|-id=951 bgcolor=#E9E9E9
| 447951 ||  || — || January 11, 2008 || Mount Lemmon || Mount Lemmon Survey || — || align=right | 1.7 km || 
|-id=952 bgcolor=#E9E9E9
| 447952 ||  || — || January 16, 2008 || Kitt Peak || Spacewatch || — || align=right | 1.2 km || 
|-id=953 bgcolor=#E9E9E9
| 447953 ||  || — || December 19, 2007 || Mount Lemmon || Mount Lemmon Survey || — || align=right | 2.0 km || 
|-id=954 bgcolor=#E9E9E9
| 447954 ||  || — || January 18, 2008 || Kitt Peak || Spacewatch || — || align=right | 2.2 km || 
|-id=955 bgcolor=#E9E9E9
| 447955 ||  || — || January 28, 2008 || Altschwendt || W. Ries || — || align=right | 2.6 km || 
|-id=956 bgcolor=#E9E9E9
| 447956 ||  || — || January 28, 2008 || Altschwendt || W. Ries || — || align=right | 2.0 km || 
|-id=957 bgcolor=#E9E9E9
| 447957 ||  || — || November 5, 2007 || Mount Lemmon || Mount Lemmon Survey || — || align=right | 1.8 km || 
|-id=958 bgcolor=#E9E9E9
| 447958 ||  || — || November 14, 2007 || Mount Lemmon || Mount Lemmon Survey ||  || align=right | 2.6 km || 
|-id=959 bgcolor=#E9E9E9
| 447959 ||  || — || December 16, 2007 || Mount Lemmon || Mount Lemmon Survey || — || align=right | 1.2 km || 
|-id=960 bgcolor=#E9E9E9
| 447960 ||  || — || January 29, 2008 || La Sagra || OAM Obs. || (5) || align=right data-sort-value="0.88" | 880 m || 
|-id=961 bgcolor=#E9E9E9
| 447961 ||  || — || January 31, 2008 || Catalina || CSS || — || align=right | 1.5 km || 
|-id=962 bgcolor=#E9E9E9
| 447962 ||  || — || December 18, 2007 || Mount Lemmon || Mount Lemmon Survey || — || align=right | 2.5 km || 
|-id=963 bgcolor=#E9E9E9
| 447963 ||  || — || January 18, 2008 || Kitt Peak || Spacewatch || — || align=right | 2.3 km || 
|-id=964 bgcolor=#E9E9E9
| 447964 ||  || — || February 2, 2008 || Catalina || CSS || — || align=right | 1.6 km || 
|-id=965 bgcolor=#E9E9E9
| 447965 ||  || — || February 3, 2008 || Kitt Peak || Spacewatch || — || align=right | 1.1 km || 
|-id=966 bgcolor=#E9E9E9
| 447966 ||  || — || February 2, 2008 || Kitt Peak || Spacewatch || — || align=right | 1.5 km || 
|-id=967 bgcolor=#d6d6d6
| 447967 ||  || — || February 3, 2008 || Kitt Peak || Spacewatch || — || align=right | 4.2 km || 
|-id=968 bgcolor=#E9E9E9
| 447968 ||  || — || February 8, 2008 || Kitt Peak || Spacewatch || HOF || align=right | 2.1 km || 
|-id=969 bgcolor=#d6d6d6
| 447969 ||  || — || February 8, 2008 || Mount Lemmon || Mount Lemmon Survey || — || align=right | 3.4 km || 
|-id=970 bgcolor=#E9E9E9
| 447970 ||  || — || February 6, 2008 || Catalina || CSS || — || align=right | 2.3 km || 
|-id=971 bgcolor=#E9E9E9
| 447971 ||  || — || December 31, 2007 || Mount Lemmon || Mount Lemmon Survey || — || align=right | 1.9 km || 
|-id=972 bgcolor=#E9E9E9
| 447972 ||  || — || February 9, 2008 || Kitt Peak || Spacewatch || WIT || align=right data-sort-value="0.96" | 960 m || 
|-id=973 bgcolor=#E9E9E9
| 447973 ||  || — || August 28, 2006 || Kitt Peak || Spacewatch || — || align=right | 1.5 km || 
|-id=974 bgcolor=#E9E9E9
| 447974 ||  || — || February 9, 2008 || Socorro || LINEAR || — || align=right | 1.1 km || 
|-id=975 bgcolor=#E9E9E9
| 447975 ||  || — || December 5, 2007 || Mount Lemmon || Mount Lemmon Survey || — || align=right | 2.4 km || 
|-id=976 bgcolor=#FA8072
| 447976 ||  || — || December 20, 2007 || Mount Lemmon || Mount Lemmon Survey || — || align=right | 1.8 km || 
|-id=977 bgcolor=#FFC2E0
| 447977 ||  || — || February 12, 2008 || Socorro || LINEAR || AMOcritical || align=right data-sort-value="0.68" | 680 m || 
|-id=978 bgcolor=#E9E9E9
| 447978 ||  || — || February 8, 2008 || Kitt Peak || Spacewatch || — || align=right | 1.8 km || 
|-id=979 bgcolor=#d6d6d6
| 447979 ||  || — || February 8, 2008 || Kitt Peak || Spacewatch || KOR || align=right | 1.4 km || 
|-id=980 bgcolor=#E9E9E9
| 447980 ||  || — || February 8, 2008 || Kitt Peak || Spacewatch || — || align=right | 2.1 km || 
|-id=981 bgcolor=#E9E9E9
| 447981 ||  || — || February 3, 2008 || Catalina || CSS || — || align=right | 1.5 km || 
|-id=982 bgcolor=#E9E9E9
| 447982 ||  || — || February 1, 2008 || Kitt Peak || Spacewatch || — || align=right | 1.5 km || 
|-id=983 bgcolor=#E9E9E9
| 447983 ||  || — || February 9, 2008 || Purple Mountain || PMO NEO || WIT || align=right | 1.3 km || 
|-id=984 bgcolor=#E9E9E9
| 447984 ||  || — || February 10, 2008 || Catalina || CSS || — || align=right | 1.4 km || 
|-id=985 bgcolor=#E9E9E9
| 447985 ||  || — || February 10, 2008 || Mount Lemmon || Mount Lemmon Survey || — || align=right | 2.1 km || 
|-id=986 bgcolor=#d6d6d6
| 447986 ||  || — || February 12, 2008 || Kitt Peak || Spacewatch || — || align=right | 2.8 km || 
|-id=987 bgcolor=#E9E9E9
| 447987 ||  || — || February 6, 2008 || Socorro || LINEAR || — || align=right | 1.4 km || 
|-id=988 bgcolor=#E9E9E9
| 447988 ||  || — || January 11, 2008 || Socorro || LINEAR || — || align=right | 2.8 km || 
|-id=989 bgcolor=#E9E9E9
| 447989 ||  || — || February 2, 2008 || Socorro || LINEAR || — || align=right | 1.4 km || 
|-id=990 bgcolor=#E9E9E9
| 447990 ||  || — || February 7, 2008 || Kitt Peak || Spacewatch || — || align=right | 1.6 km || 
|-id=991 bgcolor=#d6d6d6
| 447991 ||  || — || February 9, 2008 || Mount Lemmon || Mount Lemmon Survey || — || align=right | 2.7 km || 
|-id=992 bgcolor=#E9E9E9
| 447992 ||  || — || February 2, 2008 || Mount Lemmon || Mount Lemmon Survey || WIT || align=right | 1.0 km || 
|-id=993 bgcolor=#E9E9E9
| 447993 ||  || — || February 8, 2008 || Kitt Peak || Spacewatch || — || align=right | 1.4 km || 
|-id=994 bgcolor=#E9E9E9
| 447994 ||  || — || February 9, 2008 || Kitt Peak || Spacewatch || HOF || align=right | 2.4 km || 
|-id=995 bgcolor=#E9E9E9
| 447995 ||  || — || February 13, 2008 || Mount Lemmon || Mount Lemmon Survey || AGN || align=right | 1.1 km || 
|-id=996 bgcolor=#d6d6d6
| 447996 ||  || — || February 13, 2008 || Mount Lemmon || Mount Lemmon Survey || — || align=right | 1.9 km || 
|-id=997 bgcolor=#E9E9E9
| 447997 ||  || — || February 8, 2008 || Kitt Peak || Spacewatch || — || align=right | 1.6 km || 
|-id=998 bgcolor=#E9E9E9
| 447998 ||  || — || February 2, 2008 || Kitt Peak || Spacewatch || HOF || align=right | 2.0 km || 
|-id=999 bgcolor=#d6d6d6
| 447999 ||  || — || February 7, 2008 || Kitt Peak || Spacewatch || — || align=right | 2.3 km || 
|-id=000 bgcolor=#E9E9E9
| 448000 ||  || — || February 14, 2008 || Catalina || CSS || — || align=right | 1.6 km || 
|}

References

External links 
 Discovery Circumstances: Numbered Minor Planets (445001)–(450000) (IAU Minor Planet Center)

0447